= United States Navy Chaplain Corps =

Staff corps and military chaplain arm of the United States Navy

- Seal of the United States Navy Chaplain Corps
- Founded: 28 November 1775; 250 years ago
- Country: United States
- Branch: United States Navy
- Website: US Navy Chaplain Corps

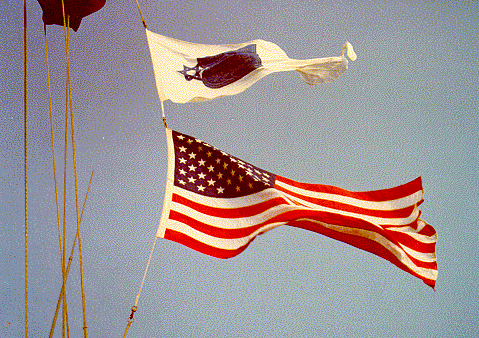
Jewish Worship Pennant, flying over the national ensign (U.S. flag) on a U.S. Navy ship.

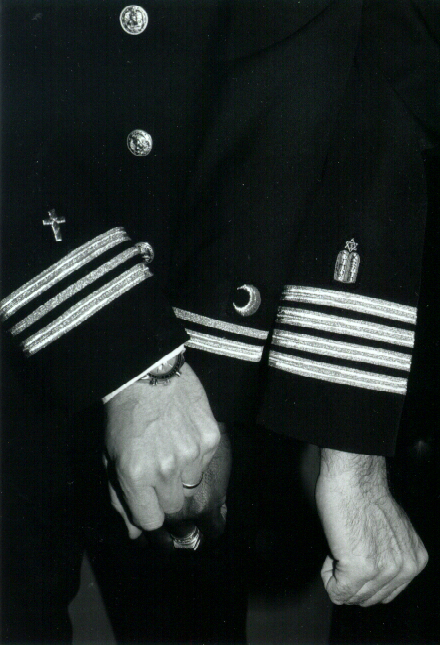
The insignia for Christian, Muslim, and Jewish chaplains are shown on the uniforms of three U.S. Navy chaplains.

The United States Navy Chaplain Corps is the body of military chaplains of the United States Navy who are commissioned naval officers. Their principal purpose is "to promote the spiritual, religious, moral, and personal well-being of the members of the Department of the Navy", which includes the Navy and the United States Marine Corps. Additionally, the Chaplain Corps provides chaplains to the United States Coast Guard.

The Chaplain Corps consists of clergy endorsed from ecclesiastical bodies providing assistance for all Navy, Marine Corps, Merchant Marine, and Coast Guard personnel and their families. Navy chaplains come from a variety of religious backgrounds; chaplains are Catholic, Protestant, Orthodox, Jewish, Muslim, and Buddhist.

Chaplains have non-combatant status and do not participate directly in hostilities. In the U.S. they are prohibited from carrying weapons. Chaplains are assisted by Navy enlisted personnel in the Religious Program Specialist (RP) rating, when available. Otherwise, a variety of personnel in the Marine Corps, Navy, and Coast Guard—as applicable—may support unit chaplains. RPs who are combatants also serve as the armed protection for chaplains in combat and other operational environments. Since RPs are enlisted, the Chaplain Corps, while protective of them, does not "own" the rating.

== History ==
A navy chaplain in May 2014 speaks about his work during an official visit to the Philippines

The history of the Chaplain Corps traces its beginnings to 28 November 1775 when the second article of Navy Regulations was adopted. It stated that "the Commanders of the ships of the thirteen United Colonies are to take care that divine services be performed twice a day on board and a sermon preached on Sundays unless bad weather or other extraordinary accidents prevent." Although chaplains were not specifically mentioned in this article, one can infer that Congress intended that an ordained clergyman be part of ship's company.

United States Navy Chaplain Corps was established on 28 November 1775.

The Continental Navy, the predecessor of the United States Navy, was approved by the Second Continental Congress on 13 October 1775. It was administered by a Marine Committee of three members later expanded to seven members. The Navy Regulations adopted by the Marine Committee on 28 November 1775 mirrored those of the Royal Navy.

The first mention of a chaplain in the Journals of the Continental Congress refers to his share in the distribution of prize money. On 6 January 1776, Congress passed a resolution detailing the prize share percentages and includes the distribution of a portion to the chaplain. On 15 November 1776, Congress fixed the base pay of the chaplain at $20 a month. The first chaplain known to have served in the Continental Navy was the Reverend Benjamin Balch, a Congregational minister, whose father had served in a similar capacity in the Royal Navy. Benjamin Balch's son, William Balch, is the first chaplain known to have received a commission in the U.S. Navy after the department was established in 1798.

During World War II, at least 24 Chaplains died, with three being killed during the Attack on Pearl Harbor.

== Qualifications ==
The Navy accepts clergy from religious denominations and faith groups. Clergy must be endorsed by an approved endorsing agency. Once endorsed, clergy must meet requirements established by the Department of the Navy including age and physical fitness requirements. A chaplain's ecclesiastical endorsement can be withdrawn by the endorser at any time, after which the chaplain is no longer able to serve as a chaplain.

Qualified applicants must be U.S. citizens at least 21 years old; meet certain medical and physical fitness standards; hold a bachelor's degree, with no less than 120 semester hours from a qualified educational institution; and hold a post-baccalaureate graduate degree, which includes 72 semester hours of graduate-level coursework in theological or related studies. At least one-half of these hours must include topics in general religion, theology, religious philosophy, ethics, and/or the foundational writings from one's religious tradition. Accredited distance education graduate programs are acceptable.

Chaplains then attend the Navy Chaplain School at Ft. Jackson, South Carolina, at the Armed Forces Chaplaincy Center (AFCC).

The Navy has a "Chaplain Candidate Program Officer" (CCPO) Program for seminary students interested in obtaining a commission before completing their graduate studies.

=== Naval Chaplaincy School and Center ===
The Naval Chaplaincy School and Center (NCSC) is located at Naval Station Newport in Rhode Island. Its mission is to train, develop, and inspire chaplains and religious program specialists to pursue excellence as they strengthen the soul of the warfighter, the family, and the fleet. The NCSC trains Navy chaplains (1945, 4105, 4100) and religious program specialists (RP) to fulfill a critical role in helping the Department of the Navy achieve and maintain a ready force.

== Mission ==
Navy chaplains explain their duties

The mission of the Chaplain Corps is:

- PROVIDE religious ministry and support to those of our own faith.
- FACILITATE for all religious beliefs.
- CARE for all Marine, Navy and Coast Guard personnel and their families.
- ADVISE commanders to ensure the free exercise of religion.

=== Priorities ===
- Promote ethical and moral behavior throughout the Sea Services.
- Ensure religious ministry enhances current readiness.
- Think strategically for future readiness.
- Employ Reserve religious ministry assets more effectively.
- Realign assets to improve religious ministry for operational forces.
- Improve recruitment and retention.
- Enhance external and internal communications.
- Leverage technology to support the mission.

=== Guiding principles ===
The guiding principles are:

- We are faithful to our individual religious traditions and practices.
- We respect the right of others to hold spiritual beliefs and religious practices different from our own.
- We cooperate and collaborate in ministry.
- We are committed to the highest standards of morality and personal integrity.
- We are committed to professionalism in the performance of duty.

=== Vision ===
Mission-ready sailors, marines, and their families, demonstrating spiritual, moral and ethical maturity, supported by the delivery of religious ministry and compassionate pastoral care.

== Controversies ==
The United States Navy is required to be responsive to diverse requirements of sailors, Marines, Coast Guardsmen, Merchant Marines and all their family members. Since its inception over two centuries ago, the United States Navy Chaplain Corps has experienced several controversies in fulfilling such requirements as a Staff Corps community within the U.S. Navy.

Some contemporary controversies include the filing of class-action lawsuits by "non-liturgical" active and former active-duty Protestant chaplains alleging religious discrimination. These chaplains argued that the Navy allegedly employed a quota system that caused "non-liturgical" Protestant chaplains to be underrepresented through the current career promotion established by the Department of the Navy. However, in April 2007, a U.S. District Court in Washington, D.C., rejected one of these challenges to the Navy's chaplain-selection criteria. The court held that the Navy had abandoned the thirds policy and said that its current criteria were constitutional because the Navy has broad discretion to determine how to accommodate the religious needs of its service members. This decision was affirmed in 2008 by the United States Court of Appeals for the District of Columbia Circuit.

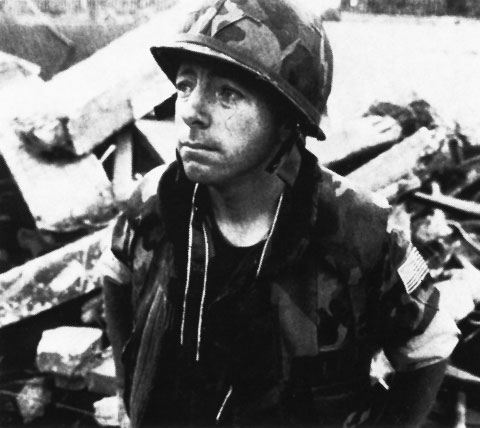
Navy Chaplain (Fr.) George Pucciarelli wears a stole over his Marine Corps camouflage uniform that he donned to deliver Last Rites after the 1983 truck bomb attack. He tore off a piece of his uniform to make a new kippa for Jewish chaplain Arnold Resnicoff, as they ministered side-by-side to all Marines

== Leadership ==
- Chief of Chaplains of the United States Navy
- Chaplain of the United States Marine Corps
- Chaplain of the Coast Guard

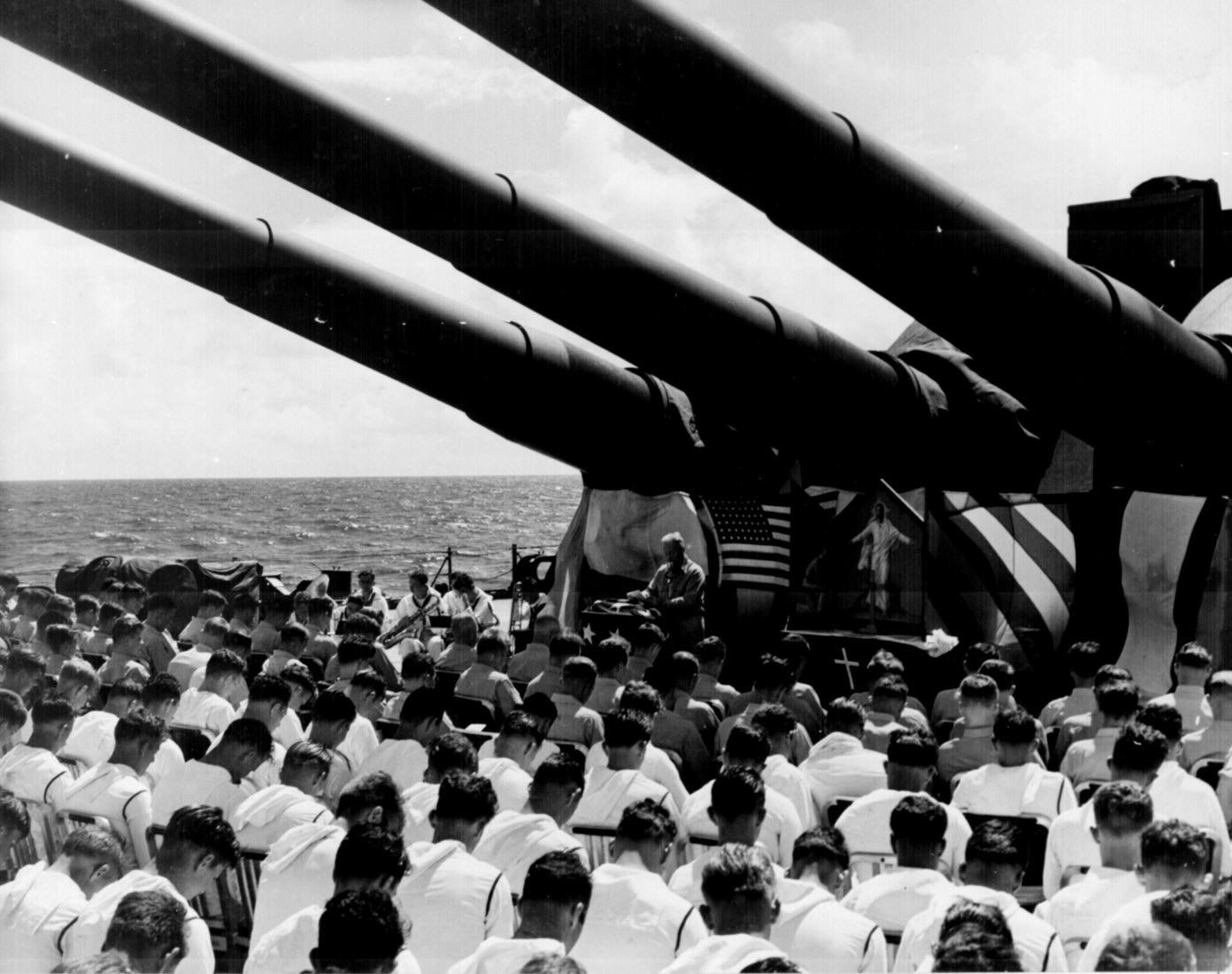
On 1 July 1944, Chaplain Lindner reads the benediction held in honor of USS South Dakota shipmates killed in the air action off Guam

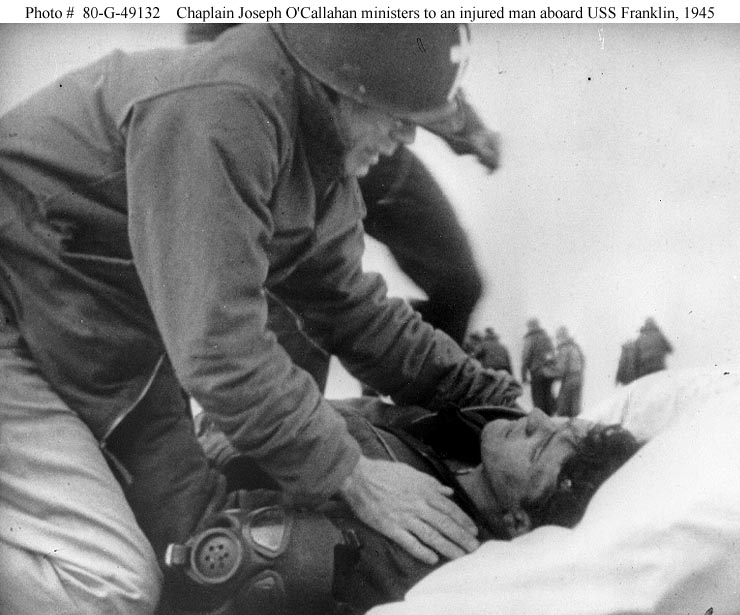
Chaplain Joseph T. O'Callahan ministers to an injured man aboard USS Franklin, 1945.

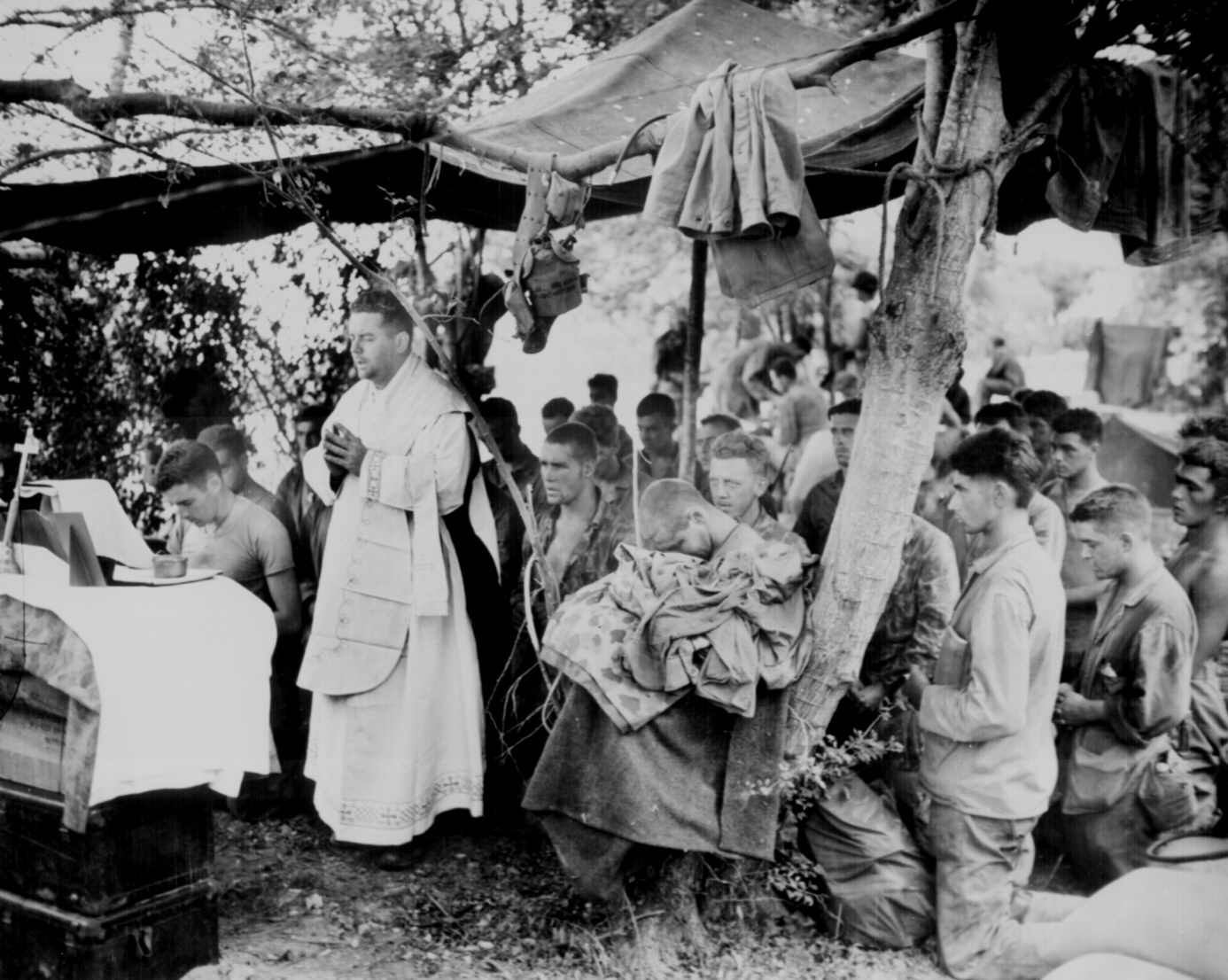
A U.S. Navy chaplain celebrates Catholic Mass for Marines at Saipan, June 1944, commemorating comrades fallen in initial amphibious landings.

== Federal Service Academy Chapels ==
- Naval Academy Chapel
- Commodore Uriah P. Levy Center and Jewish Chapel at the U.S. Naval Academy.
- The Coast Guard Memorial Chapel al the U.S. Coast Guard Academy is attended by the U.S. Navy Chaplain Corps, the current Catholic chaplain is Lieutenant William Appel
- The Mariner's Memorial Chapel at the United States Merchant Marine Academy has been attended by the U.S. Navy Chaplain Corps since 1959.

== Prayers ==
- Eternal Father, Strong to Save (The Navy Hymn) (including special verses for Antarctic and Arctic service, divers and submariners, Naval aviation, Naval nurses, Seabees, SEALs, submariners, U.S. armed forces, wounded in combat, and for those deployed)
- Midshipman Prayer
- Coast Guard prayers
- Marine Prayer
- Navy Hospital Corpsman Prayer

== Notable chaplains ==
- Barry Black – Chaplain for 27 years and 22nd Chief of Chaplains of the Navy.
- Vincent R. Capodanno – Chaplain during Vietnam War. Third chaplain and second Navy chaplain to be awarded the Medal of Honor. USS Capodanno was named in his honor. Cause for canonization to sainthood is ongoing.
- John P. Chidwick – Chaplain on USS Maine.
- Frederic P. Gehring – Chaplain during World War II. First Navy chaplain awarded the Legion of Merit for conspicuous gallantry.
- John F. Laboon Jr. – Chaplain during Vietnam War. Awarded the Legion of Merit. USS Laboon was named in his honor.
- Adam Marshall – First Catholic chaplain in the Navy.
- Joseph T. O'Callahan – Chaplain during World War II. Awarded the Medal of Honor. USS O'Callahan was named in his honor.
- John Joseph O'Connor – Chaplain during the Korean War and 14th Chief of Chaplains of the Navy. Later Roman Catholic Archbishop of New York and Cardinal.
- George S. Rentz – Chaplain during World War I and World War II. Only Navy chaplain to be awarded the Navy Cross during World War II. USS Rentz was named in his honor.
- Aloysius H. Schmitt – First chaplain to die in World War II; chaplain on USS Oklahoma during the attack on Pearl Harbor. USS Schmitt was named in his honor.
- William Nathaniel Thomas – 7th Chief of Chaplains of the U.S. Navy 1945-1949. "One of the most distinguished Chaplains ever to serve in the U.S. Navy." He wrote the Prayer of the Midshipman and the Dedication in Memorial Hall at the Naval Academy.

=== Ships named for Navy chaplains ===
- USS Rentz (FFG-46)
- USS Kirkpatrick (DE 318)
- USS O'Callahan (FF-1051)
- USS Capodanno (FF-1093)
- USS Schmitt (DE-676)
- USS Laboon (DDG-58)

== See also ==
- Burial at sea § United States Navy
- Chaplain assistant (Army)
- Chaplain's Medal for Heroism
- Chaplains Hill (Arlington National Cemetery)
- Four Chaplains — famously elected to donate their life jackets when troop-transport ship Dorchester sank in World War II
- Imam
- Insignia of chaplain schools in the United States military
- Minister
- Priest
- Rabbi
- United States Air Force Chaplain Corps
- United States Army Chaplain Corps
- United States military chaplains
