= Rentz (disambiguation) =

Rentz may refer to:

- Rentz, Georgia, a small town in Laurens County, Georgia, United States
- George S. Rentz (July 25, 1882 – March 1, 1942), a United States Navy chaplain who served during World War I and World War II
- Larry Rentz (born 1947), American football player
- USS Rentz (FFG-46), the 40th ship to be constructed in the Oliver Hazard Perry class of guided missile frigates of the United States Navy
- Madame Rentz's Female Minstrels, a blackface minstrel troupe composed completely of women
