= Laboon =

Laboon may refer to:

- USS Laboon, an Arleigh Burke-class destroyer in the United States Navy commissioned in 1995
- John F. Laboon (1921–1988), a United States Navy submarine captain and chaplain
- Laboon, a fictional whale in the One Piece media
