= Aloysius Schmitt =

American Roman Catholic World War II chaplain

Aloysius H. Schmitt
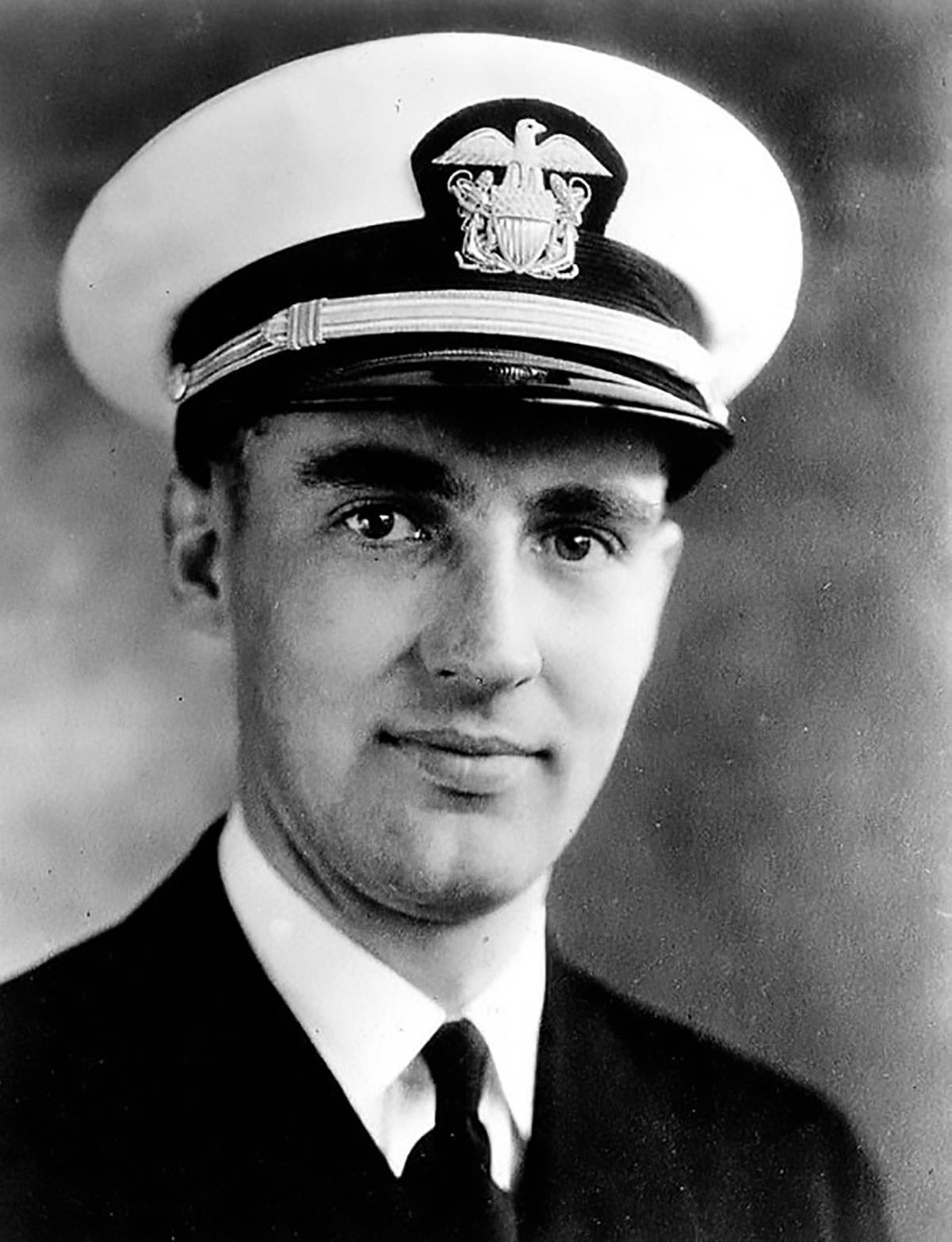
- Born: Aloysius Herman Schmitt; 4 December 1909; St. Lucas, Iowa, United States
- Died: 7 December 1941 (aged 32); Aboard USS Oklahoma, Pearl Harbor, Hawaii, United States
- Military career
- Allegiance: United States
- Service years: 1939–1941
- Rank: Lieutenant junior grade
- Units: USS Oklahoma
- Awards: Silver Star; Navy and Marine Corps Medal; Purple Heart

Father Aloysius H. Schmitt (December 4, 1909 – December 7, 1941) was a Roman Catholic priest at the Archdiocese of Dubuque, who served as a chaplain in the United States Navy at the beginning of World War II.

== Early life and ordination ==
Born in St. Lucas, Iowa to Henry and Mary Anna (Kuennen) Schmitt, Schmitt studied at Columbia College (now Loras College) in Dubuque, Iowa and graduated in 1932. He then studied in Rome for the priesthood. He was ordained on December 8, 1935. Father Schmitt was first assigned as an associate at Saint Mary's Church in Dubuque. He was also assigned to St. Mary's Cathedral in Cheyenne, Wyoming. After four years, he received permission to become a chaplain, and joined the United States Navy. He was appointed Acting Chaplain with rank of Lieutenant, Junior Grade (LTJG) on June 28, 1939.

== Military service and death ==
On December 7, 1941, Fr. Schmitt was serving on board the battleship USS Oklahoma during the Japanese attack on Pearl Harbor, when a hit caused the ship to capsize. A number of sailors, including Fr. Schmitt, were trapped in a compartment with only a small porthole as the means of escape. Fr. Schmitt helped a number of men through this porthole. When it came his time to leave, he declined and helped more men escape. In total, he helped 12 men escape.

Fr. Schmitt died on board the Oklahoma, and was the first chaplain from USA of any faith to have died in World War II. Most of the bodies were recovered after the ship was righted in 1943. His remains were originally buried in a cemetery in Hawaii as an "Unknown." In 1944, the Navy presented a specially made crucifix to the Archdiocese of Dubuque, in honor of Chaplain Schmitt. It was 24 inches tall and was made from the teakwood deck of the Oklahoma. The corpus of Christ on the crucifix was shaped from the ship's metal. The presentation was made by the chief of chaplains, 8th Naval district.

In 2015, the United States Department of Defense exhumed the remains of what were believed to be 388 military personnel. Schmitt's remains were identified in 2016 from DNA taken from his skull and matched with that of a relative. They were returned to Iowa where a Memorial Mass was celebrated in his home parish of St. Luke in St. Lucas on October 5, 2016. His remains were transferred to Dubuque, where a funeral Mass and burial were held in Christ the King Chapel at Loras College on October 8, 2016.

== Awards and honors ==

Silver Star
Navy and Marine Corps Medal (Upgraded to Silver Star)	Purple Heart	Combat Action Ribbon
American Defense Service Medal w/ Fleet Clasp (3/16" Bronze Star)	Asiatic-Pacific Campaign Medal w/ one 3/16" Bronze Star	World War II Victory Medal

=== Silver Star citation ===
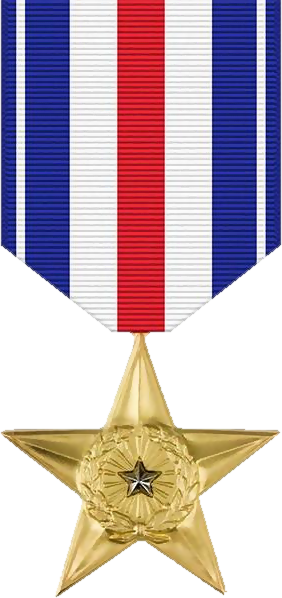

Bureau of Naval Personnel Information Bulletin No. 308 (November 1942)

The President of the United States of America takes pride in presenting the Silver Star (Posthumously) to Lieutenant, Junior Grade (Chaplain) Aloysius Herman Schmitt (NSN: 0-83472), United States Navy, for heroism involving voluntary risk of life not involving conflict with an armed enemy, while serving as a Chaplain on board the U.S.S. OKLAHOMA, during the attack by Japanese forces at Pearl Harbor, Territory of Hawaii, on 7 December 1941. Chaplain Schmitt was aboard the U.S.S. OKLAHOMA when that vessel capsized and was entrapped in a compartment where only a small porthole provided outlet for escape. With unselfish disregard for his own plight, Chaplain Schmitt assisted his shipmates through the porthole. While his shipmates were in the process of rescuing him his body became wedged in the narrow opening. Realizing that other men had come into the compartment looking for a way out, Chaplain Schmitt insisted that he be pushed back into the ship so that they might escape. Calmly urging them on with a pronouncement of his blessing, he remained behind while they crawled out to safety.

=== Posthumous honors ===
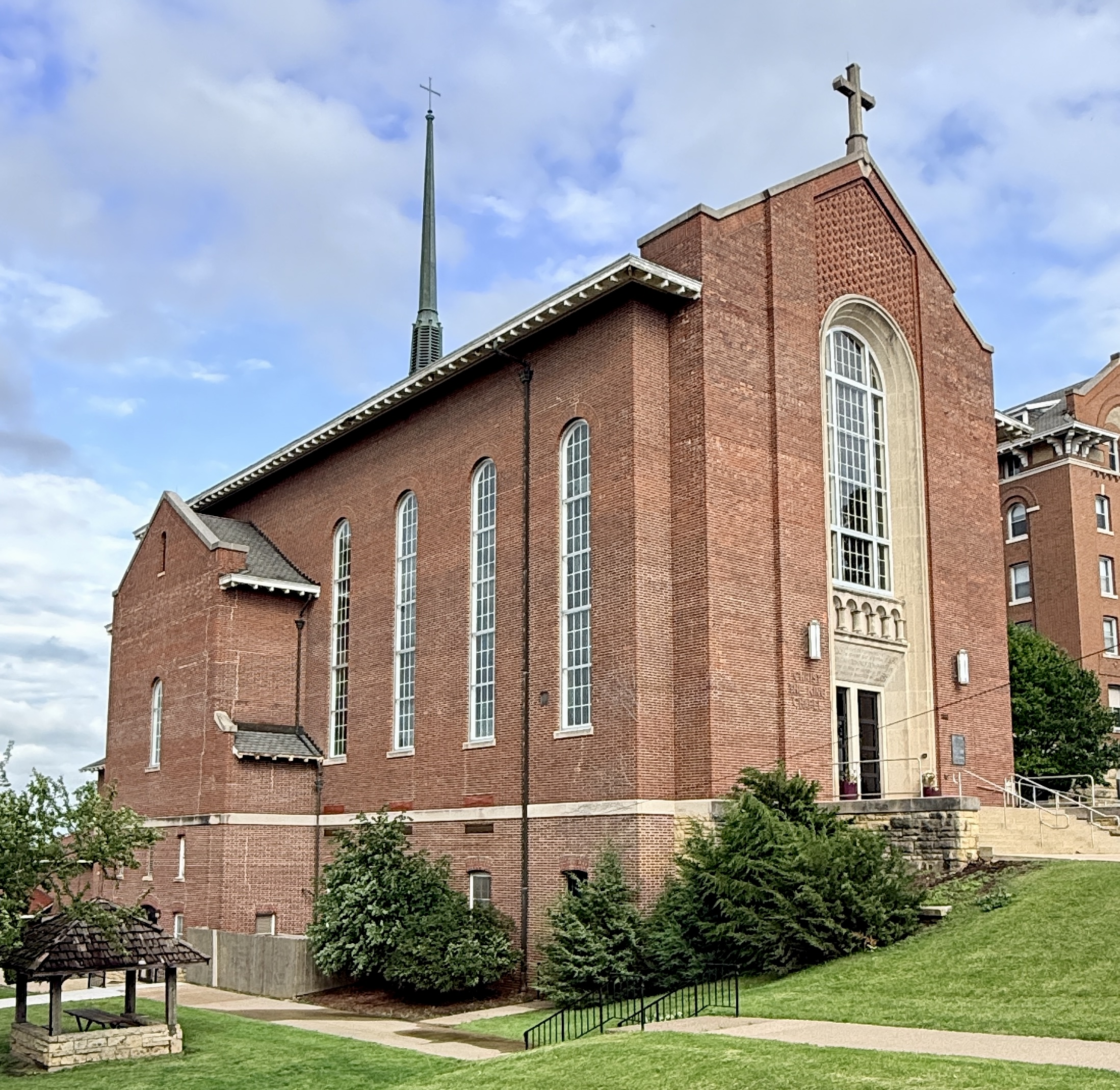
Christ the King Chapel at Loras College

- Fr. Schmitt was honored posthumously by the U.S. government when it awarded him the Navy and Marine Corps Medal and Purple Heart. On December 7, 2017, he was awarded the Silver Star.
- St. Francis Xavier Chapel at Camp Lejeune was dedicated in his memory in 1942.
- A destroyer escort named USS Schmitt was commissioned in 1943 by the Navy in his honor and served the U.S. Navy until 1967, when it was transferred to Taiwan.
- Christ the King Chapel at Loras College was dedicated in his memory in 1947 and contains some of Fr. Schmitt's personal effects that had been recovered from the Oklahoma — including his chalice and prayer book — and other items that were donated to the school. Present at the dedication were Cardinal Samuel Stritch of Chicago and Admiral Chester Nimitz, commander of the Pacific Fleet during World War II.
- City Island, in the Mississippi River near Dubuque (formerly known as Ham's Island, after Mathias Ham who once owned it) was renamed Chaplain Schmitt Memorial Island. It is the location of Q Casino.

== See also ==
- Roman Catholic priests
- Military chaplain
- United States Navy
- USS Oklahoma
- USS Schmitt
