= USS Schmitt =

Buckley-class destroyer escort

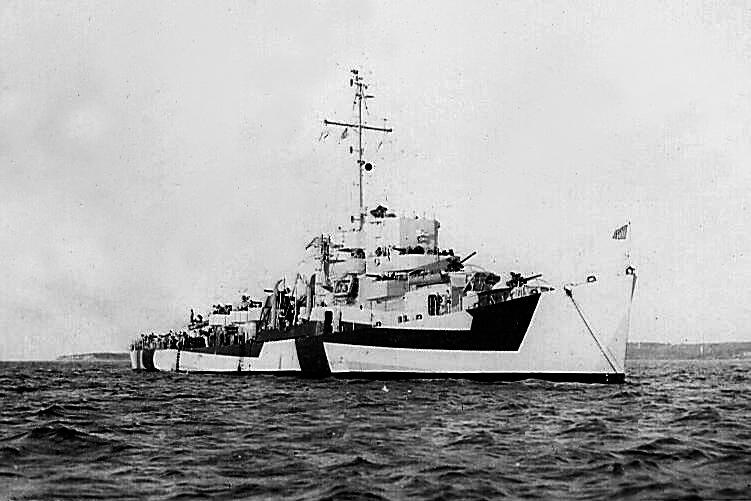

History

United States
- Name: USS Schmitt (DE-676)
- Namesake: Aloysius Schmitt
- Ordered: 1942
- Builder: Bethlehem Shipbuilding Corporation's Fore River Shipyard, Quincy, Massachusetts
- Laid down: 22 February 1943 as Buckley-class destroyer escort
- Launched: 29 May 1943
- Commissioned: 24 July 1943
- Reclassified: APD-76, 24 January 1945
- Decommissioned: 28 June 1949
- Stricken: 1 May 1967
- Honors and awards: 1 battle star (World War II)
- Fate: Sold to Taiwan, February 1968

History

Taiwan
- Name: ROCS Lung Shan (DE-44)
- Acquired: February 1968
- Reclassified: PF-44
- Fate: Scrapped, 1976

General characteristics
- Class & type: Buckley-class destroyer escort
- Displacement: 1,400 long tons (1,422 t) light; 1,673 long tons (1,700 t) standard
- Length: 306 ft (93 m)
- Beam: 37 ft (11 m)
- Draft: 13 ft 6 in (4.11 m)
- Propulsion: 2 × boilers; General Electric turbo-electric drive; 12,000 shp (8.9 MW); 2 × solid manganese-bronze 3,600 lb (1,600 kg) 3-bladed propellers, 8 ft 6 in (2.59 m) diameter, 7 ft 7 in (2.31 m) pitch; 2 × rudders
- Speed: 24 knots (44 km/h; 28 mph)
- Complement: 213
- Armament: 3 × 3"/50 caliber guns; 1 × quad 1.1"/75 caliber gun; 8 × single 20 mm guns; 1 × triple 21-inch (533 mm) torpedo tubes; 8 × K-gun depth charge projectors; 2 × depth charge tracks

USS Schmitt (DE-676) was a Buckley-class destroyer escort in the United States Navy, commissioned in 1943. In late 1944, she was converted to a high speed transport and was redesignated APD-76. She was retired in 1949 and transferred to the Republic of China Navy in 1969, where she served as ROCS Lung Shan (PF-44) until 1976, when she was scrapped.

== History ==
USS Schmitt was named for Father Aloysius H. Schmitt and was laid down on 22 February 1943 by the Bethlehem Shipbuilding Company of Quincy, Massachusetts; launched on 29 May 1943, sponsored by Mrs. Elizabeth Buchheit; and commissioned on 24 July 1943.

=== U.S. Navy (1943-1949) ===
==== Battle of the Atlantic (1943-1944) ====
After shakedown in Bermuda and repairs at New York, Schmitt departed from New York on 19 October 1943 escorting a convoy to Curaçao in the West Indies, and then made her first trans-Atlantic crossing with a convoy from Curaçao to Derry, Northern Ireland. She served on the Derry-New York convoy route until 30 September 1944, crossing the ocean 16 times without incident. Between voyages, the escort underwent anti-submarine training at Derry or at Casco Bay, Maine, and received repairs made necessary by the rough North Atlantic weather.

On 21 October, Schmitt began a convoy voyage from Norfolk to Bizerte and other Mediterranean ports, returning to New York on 10 December. Between 16 December 1944 and 19 January 1945, she served as training ship for submarines at New London, Connecticut, and then on 20 January arrived at the United States Naval Frontier Base, Tompkinsville, Staten Island, New York, for conversion to a Charles Lawrence-class high speed transport. Her designation was changed to APD-76 on 24 January 1945.

==== Pacific War (1945) ====
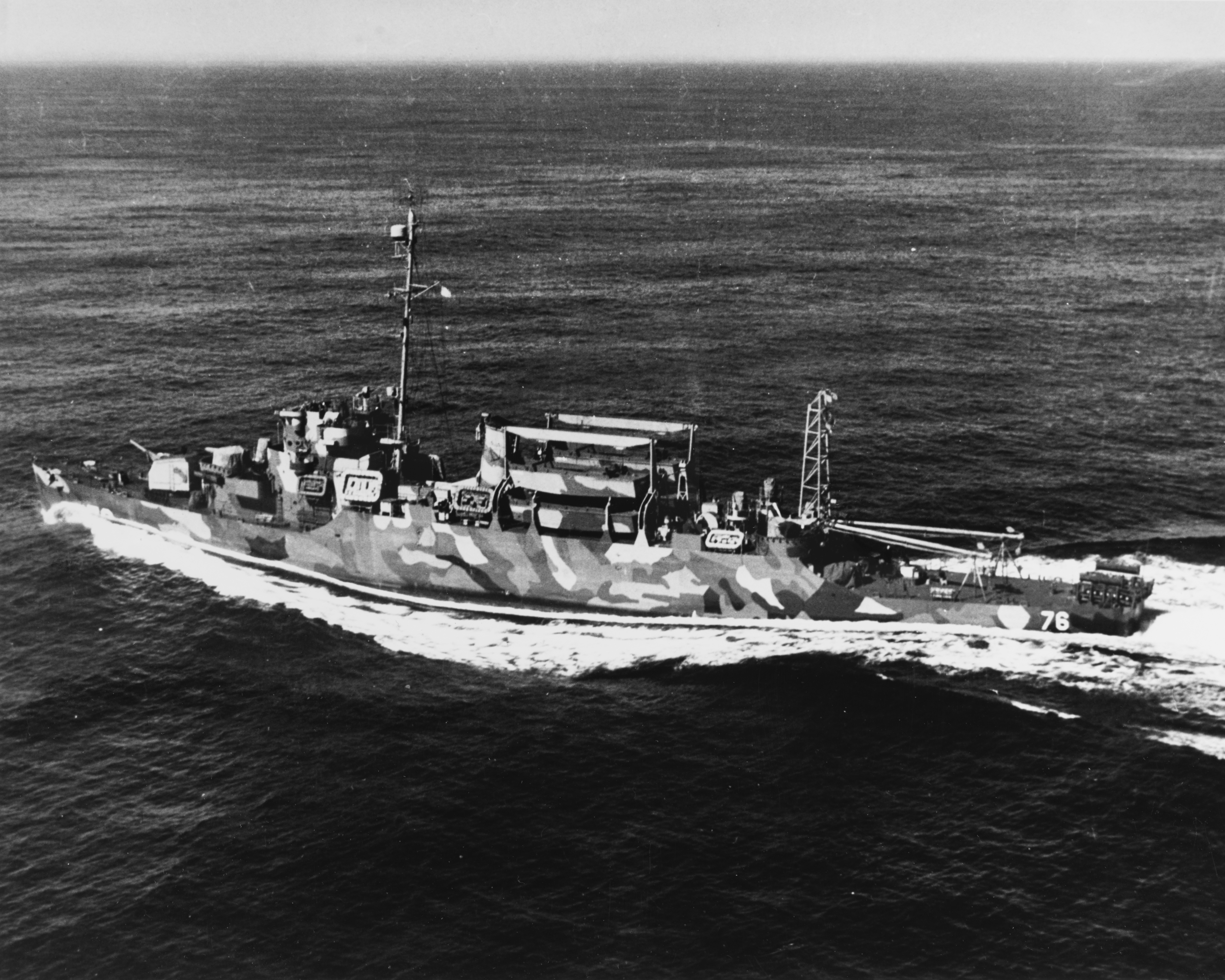
Schmitt as a high speed transport on 9 April 1945.

Schmitt completed conversion on 3 April 1945, and once again underwent shakedown, this time out of Norfolk. She departed Hampton Roads on 19 April and arrived at Pearl Harbor on 16 May. She embarked Underwater Demolition Teams there and carried out six days of exercises with them at Maui before sailing for the Southwest Pacific on 4 June. The fast transport arrived off Balikpapan, Borneo, on 23 June, and screened the bombardment group of cruisers and destroyers during shore bombardment missions between 23 and 28 June. Her UDT personnel carried out night reconnaissance operations on 25 and 28 June, with the ship resuming escort duties during the day. On 1 July, Schmitt's boat led the first 17 waves of landing craft to the beach. The ship left Balikpapan on 3 July, disembarking her UDT personnel at Oceanside, California, on 2 August; and, while the ship was under repair at San Pedro from 4 to 18 August, the war in the Pacific came to an end.

==== Post-war (1945–1949) ====
Schmitt reembarked UDT personnel and departed from San Pedro on 19 August. She arrived at Sasebo, Japan, on 20 September and carried out four days of beach reconnaissance there followed by two more days on nearby islands. She got underway from Japan on 27 September and returned on 19 October to San Diego. Between 17 and 30 November, she made one round-trip voyage to Pearl Harbor, bringing troops home to the United States, and then sailed through the Panama Canal and proceeded to join the Atlantic Fleet at Norfolk on 16 December.

For the next three and a half years, Schmitt conducted peacetime training and upkeep along the Atlantic Coast, highlighted by refresher training and shore bombardment practice in the Caribbean and amphibious landing exercises in Newfoundland and Labrador. She varied her normal routine between 12 June and 7 July 1948 when she escorted four Naval Academy sailing yawls in the Newport to Bermuda race. On 16 April 1949, the fast transport arrived at Charleston, South Carolina, for inactivation, and was decommissioned and placed in reserve there on 28 June.

=== Republic of China Navy (1969-1976) ===
Schmitt was struck from the Navy List on 1 May 1967, and transferred in February 1969 to the Republic of China Navy as ROCS Lung Shan (PF-44). She was subsequently scrapped in 1976.

== Awards ==
Schmitt received one battle star for her World War II service.
