= John F. Laboon =

US Navy officer and chaplain (1921–1988)

John Francis Laboon Jr.
- Born: April 11, 1921; Pittsburgh, Pennsylvania
- Died: August 1, 1988 (aged 67); Granite, Maryland
- Burial place: Woodstock College Jesuit Theologate Cemetery, Granite, Maryland
- Military career
- Allegiance: United States of America
- Branch: United States Navy
- Service years: 1943–1980
- Rank: Captain
- Nickname: "Father Jake"
- Unit: USS Peto (SS-265)
- Conflicts: World War II; Pacific War; Vietnam War
- Awards: Silver Star; Legion of Merit

John Francis "Jake" Laboon Jr. (11 April 1921 – 1 August 1988) was an officer of the United States Navy, who served as a submariner in World War II and as a Roman Catholic chaplain in the Vietnam War.

== Early life ==
Born in Pittsburgh, Pennsylvania, on 11 April 1921, John Laboon attended the Carnegie Institute of Technology for one year after high school at Pittsburgh Central Catholic High School. In 1939, he entered the United States Naval Academy, where he excelled in both athletics and academics. In 1942, he was a member of the All-East Football Team, and in 1943, "jumped ship" to college lacrosse, where he was selected for the Intercollegiate National Championship Navy Lacrosse Team, defenseman on the All-American Lacrosse Squad, and participated in the North-South All-Star game. He also served as president of the Newman Club, a Catholic campus ministry group.

== World War II ==
After accelerated graduation in 1943, he trained as a submarine officer at New London, Connecticut, and upon completion, was assigned to USS Peto (SS-265). During his tour, Laboon served as Communications Officer, Gunnery and Torpedo Officer, and Executive Officer.

Lieutenant (junior grade) Laboon was awarded the Silver Star for his heroic actions on Peto's tenth war patrol. Following pick-up of a downed American pilot near Honshū, the crew searched for his wingman. The second aviator was soon spotted, but the water was shallow and mined, preventing Peto from maneuvering closer. To make matters worse, they were under intense enemy fire from a Japanese shore battery. The submarine's commanding officer called for a volunteer, and without hesitation, LTJG Laboon dove off the submarine. Swimming through the mined waters, he rescued the pilot.

== Priesthood ==
Lieutenant Laboon resigned from naval service shortly after the end of World War II, and entered the Society of Jesus (Jesuits) on 31 October 1946. On 17 July 1956, Father Jake was ordained a Jesuit priest at Woodstock, Maryland.

Father Laboon then applied for a commission in the U.S. Naval Reserve Chaplain Corps in February 1957, and in December 1958 was recalled to active duty. Over the course of the next 22 years, "Father Jake" served in various duty stations around the world, including Alaska, Hawaii, Japan and South Vietnam. While in Vietnam, he was awarded the Legion of Merit with Combat "V" for his fearless actions as battlefield Chaplain with the 3rd Marine Division in April 1969.

Other notable milestones in his distinguished career included the honor of nomination for promotion to the rank of admiral and service as chief of chaplains. The Polaris submarine program was also blessed with having Father Jake as its first chaplain. The U.S. Naval Academy was likewise honored with his services as the Senior Catholic Chaplain. On 31 October 1980, Captain Laboon retired as Fleet Chaplain, U.S. Atlantic Fleet.

Laboon appeared as himself on the April 21, 1959 episode of the CBS television game show To Tell the Truth, receiving two of four votes.

After retirement from the navy, Father Laboon returned to Annapolis, Maryland, to oversee the construction of the Jesuit-retreat facility, Manresa-on-Severn, within view of the U.S. Naval Academy. His final assignment was pastor of St. Alphonsus Rodriguez Church in Woodstock, Maryland. He served there until his death on 1 August 1988.

In 1993, the destroyer USS Laboon (DDG-58) was named in honor of Father Laboon. The Chaplain's Center at the Naval Academy is also named in his honor.
