= Midshipman Prayer =

Prayer composed for the U.S. Naval Academy in 1938

The "Prayer of a Midshipman" was written by William Nathaniel Thomas in 1938. Thomas (1892-1979) was the Chief of Chaplains of the United States Navy. He wrote the "Prayer of a Midshipman" at the request of the midshipmen while Command Chaplain at the United States Naval Academy, Annapolis, Maryland. It is said to encompass much of his theology and his ideal of a Naval Officer. He never sought credit for the prayer. There is an original version and an ungendered interfaith version. The prayer has been used at Divine Services at the US Naval Academy Chapel ever since 1938. A bronze plaque of the prayer resides in the chapel. During Plebe summer 2013 the US Naval Academy Chaplain Center conducted a Midshipman Prayer Sermon Series. “Each Sunday during the Plebe Summer of 2013, the preacher for that week addressed one of the petitions of the Midshipman Prayer. The scripture readings were specially selected to complement and expand on the petition rather than follow the traditional Revised Common Lectionary.”

== Midshipman Prayer 1938 ==
Almighty Father, whose way is in the sea, and whose paths are in the great waters, whose command is over all and whose love never faileth: Let me be aware of Thy presence and obedient to Thy will. Keep me true to my best self, guarding me against dishonesty in purpose and in deed, and helping me so to live that I can stand unashamed and unafraid before my shipmates, my loved ones, and Thee. Protect those in whose love I live. Give me the will to do the work of a man and to accept my share of responsibilities with a strong heart and a cheerful mind. Make me considerate of those entrusted to my leadership and faithful to the duties my country has intrusted to me. Let my uniform remind me daily of the traditions of the Service of which I am a part. If I am inclined to doubt, steady my faith; if I am tempted, make me strong to resist; if I should miss the mark, give me courage to try again. Guide me with the light of truth and keep before me the life of Him by whose example and help I trust to obtain the answer to my prayer, Jesus Christ our Lord. Amen.

== Midshipman Prayer Interfaith Version ==
Almighty God, whose way is in the sea, whose paths are in the great waters, whose command is over all and whose love never faileth; let me be aware of Thy presence and obedient to Thy will. Keep me true to my best self, guarding me against dishonesty in purpose and in deed, and helping me so to live that I can stand unashamed and unafraid before my shipmates, my loved ones, and Thee. Protect those in whose love I live. Give me the will to do my best and to accept my share of responsibilities with a strong heart and a cheerful mind. Make me considerate of those entrusted to my leadership and faithful to the duties my country has entrusted in me. Let my uniform remind me daily of the traditions of the service of which I am a part. If I am inclined to doubt, steady my faith; if I am tempted, make me strong to resist; if I should miss the mark, give me courage to try again. Guide me with the light of truth and give me strength to faithfully serve Thee, now and always. Amen.

— Chaplain’s Center, US Naval Academy, Annapolis, Maryland. Circa 1976 when women first entered the Academy.

File:Midshipman_Prayer_Plaque,_Dedication_USNA_Chapel_2018.jpgMidshipman Prayer plaque in USNA Chapel

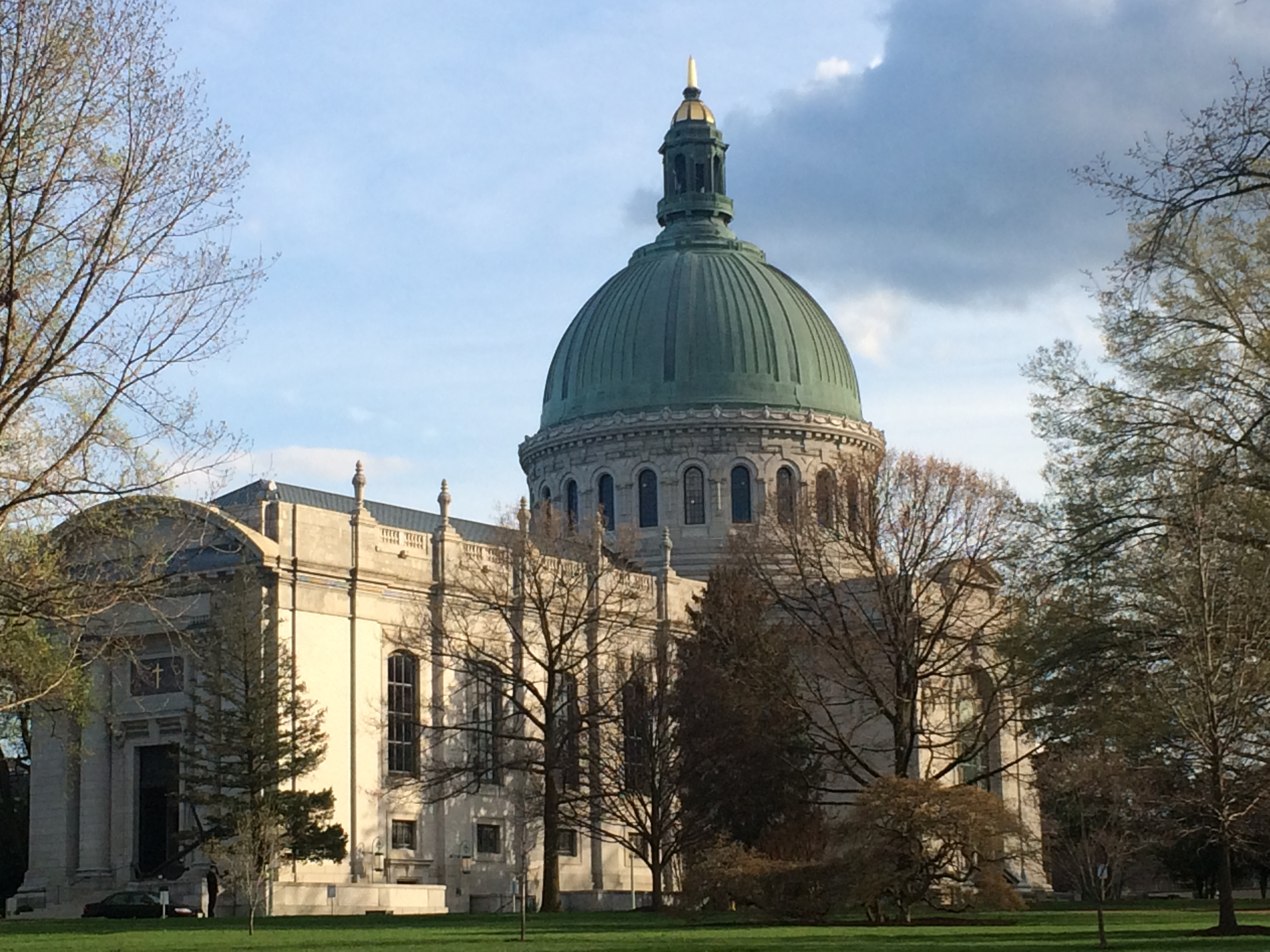
File:USNA_Chapel.jpgUSNA chapel

== Criticism ==
The Constitution establishes that there are no religious tests for office, and that the government may not make an establishment of religion. While mandatory chapel attendance at the Naval Academy ended in the 1970s, noon meal prayer continues every day. Noon meal prayer has been discontinued at USMA and USAFA.

While USNA claims the Midshipman Prayer is "interfaith," the text is specific to a monotheistic abrahamic religion. Members of other traditions at USNA, such as polytheists, members of dharmic religions, atheists, freethinkers, secularists, humanists, and a small group of satanist midshipmen, are excluded. USNA so far has declined to adopt more inclusive prayers and has had noon meal prayer for several years.
