= George S. Rentz =

United States Navy officer

George Snavely Rentz
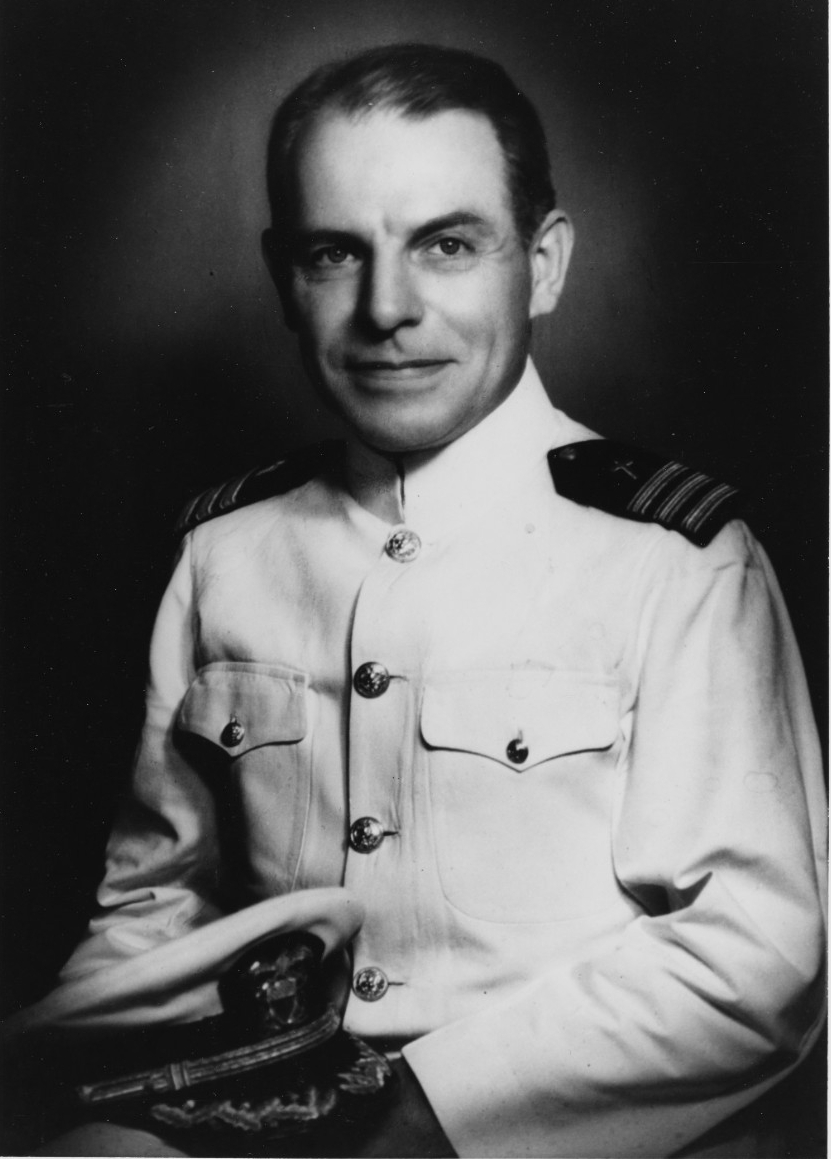
- CDR George S. Rentz
- Born: July 25, 1882; Lebanon, Pennsylvania, U.S.
- Died: March 1, 1942 (aged 59); Pacific Ocean
- Military career
- Allegiance: United States of America
- Branch: United States Navy
- Rank: Commander
- Conflicts: World War I World War II: Battle of Makassar Strait; Battle of Sunda Strait
- Awards: Navy Cross

George Snavely Rentz (July 25, 1882 – March 1, 1942) was a United States Navy chaplain who served during World War I and World War II. For selfless heroism following the loss of USS Houston (CA-30) in the Battle of Sunda Strait, he was posthumously awarded the Navy Cross— the only Navy Chaplain to be so honored during World War II.

== Personal history ==
George Rentz was born in Lebanon, Pennsylvania. He received his undergraduate degree in 1903 from Gettysburg College which was then known as Pennsylvania College. While attending he was a member of the Alpha Tau Omega fraternity. Rentz subsequently graduated from Princeton Theological Seminary and was ordained in 1909. For the next eight years he served as a Presbyterian minister for the Presbytery of Northumberland, as well as pastoring churches in Pennsylvania and New Jersey.

Upon the entry of the United States in World War I, he was appointed acting chaplain with the rank of lieutenant junior grade and assigned to the 11th Marine Regiment in France, where he served until 1919. Rentz attained the rank of commander in 1924. As chaplain, he served aboard USS Florida (BB-30), USS Wright (AV-1), USS West Virginia (BB-48), USS Augusta (CA-31) and his final duty station, Houston. During his military career, Rentz also served at the Marine Barracks in Port Royal, South Carolina, Naval Air Station Pensacola, Florida, and Naval Air Station San Diego, California.

== USS Houston ==
Commander Rentz transferred from the Augusta to the Houston in 1940 when it relieved Augusta as the flagship of the Asiatic Fleet. Rentz was a crew favorite, even going so far as to ignore regulations and dispense nips of alcohol as needed to the exhausted sailors.

During a Japanese attack on Houston at the Battle of Makassar Strait on February 4, 1942, Commander Rentz spurned cover and circulated among the crew of the anti-aircraft battery, keeping up their spirits. It was noted that, when crew members at the guns "… saw this man of God, walking fearlessly among them, they no longer felt alone." In the Flores Sea, during this attack, Houston took a direct hit that disabled turret III and killed 48 men.

Less than a month later, Houston and the Australian light cruiser HMAS Perth (D29) were directed to proceed to the Dutch East Indies port of Surabaya, where they were supposed to attack Japanese naval supply lines. En route, the two ships unexpectedly encountered a Japanese invasion force, resulting in the encounter now known as the Battle of Sunda Strait. Though outnumbered by the Japanese convoy, both ships persisted. In the ensuing melee one of the Japanese destroyers fired a spread of torpedoes that passed by the allied cruisers and sunk four of their own troopships. In the end, the Japanese forces proved too much for the wounded Perth and Houston. The final attack on these two cruisers sank first Perth and then Houston shortly before midnight on March 1, 1942.

=== Eyewitness accounts of heroism ===
It was during the abandonment of the sinking Houston that Commander Rentz entered the water and attained partial safety along with other crewmembers on a destroyed airplane's float. Seeing extreme overcrowding and the fact that the pontoon was taking on water, he attempted to relinquish his space and lifejacket to wounded survivors nearby. He declared "You men are young, I have lived the major part of my life and I am willing to go." According to Houston survivor Private Jim Gee, no one would oblige the generous, fearless chaplain. Each time Rentz attempted to leave he was brought back by his shipmates. He ultimately relinquished his lifejacket to Seaman First Class Walter L. Beeson, who recounts that Rentz "told me his heart was failing him; told me he couldn't last much longer." Following a brief prayer, the Chaplain gave the lifejacket to Beeson, who refused to put it on. Rentz kicked away from the float and disappeared. Gee recalled "No one realized what had happened. It's just one of those things that one minute he's there, and the next minute... he wasn't." When Beeson realized that Rentz was gone, he put on the lifejacket. For these actions, Rentz was posthumously awarded the United States Navy's second highest award for valor, the Navy Cross.

Chaplain Rentz had less than one year to serve before retiring. He was one of 800 men who perished out of the original crew of 1,168 aboard Houston. Of the 368 crew members who made it to shore and were captured by the Japanese, 77 would die in captivity. 291 survived to the end of the war.

== Namesake ==
The Oliver Hazard Perry-class frigate USS Rentz (FFG-46) was named in his honor.
