= Bancroft Hall =

Residence hall at the US Naval Academy

Coordinates: 38.9816°N 76.4831°W

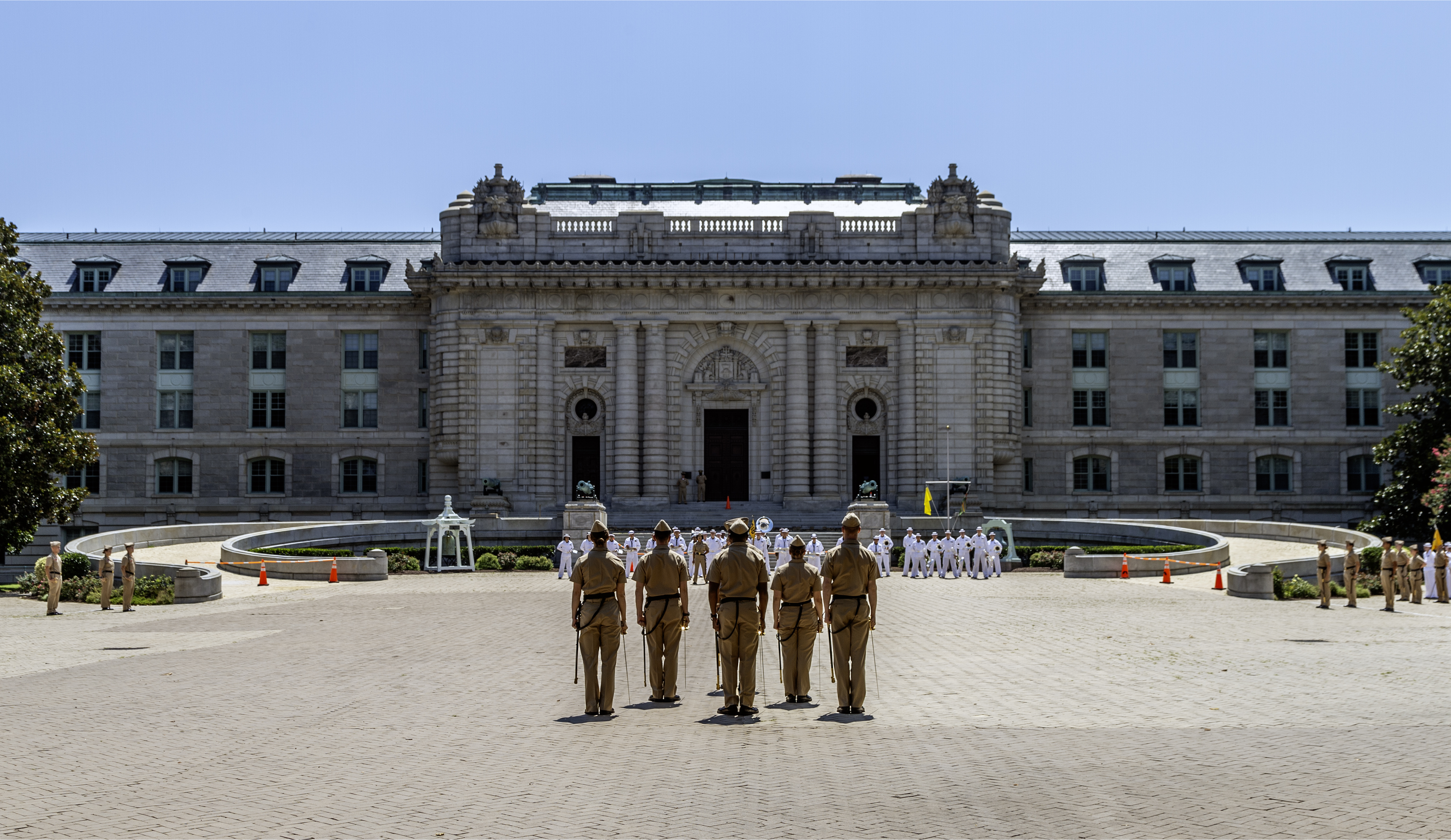
Noon Meal Formation, a daily mustering ceremony held on Tecumseh Court in front of Bancroft Hall.

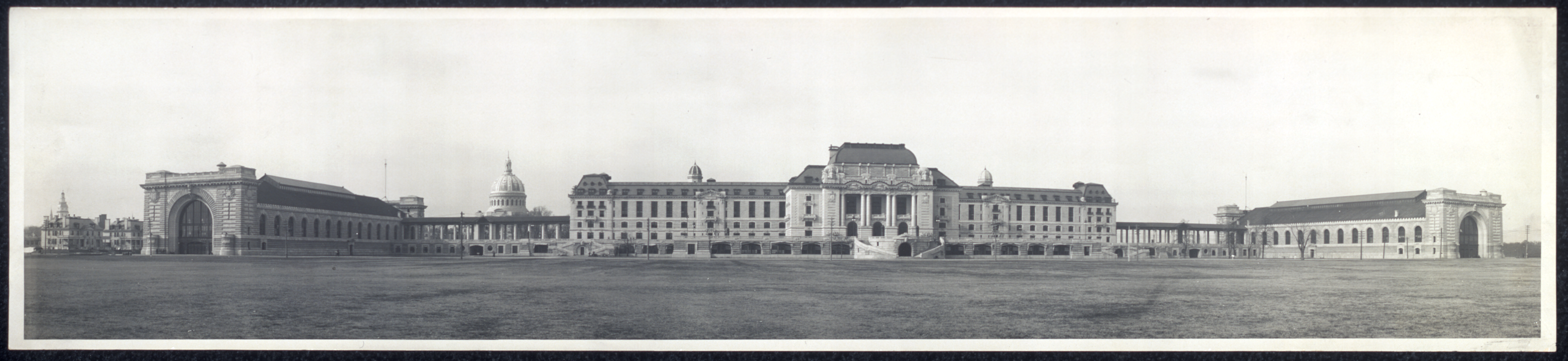
A panorama of Bancroft Hall (c. 1911)

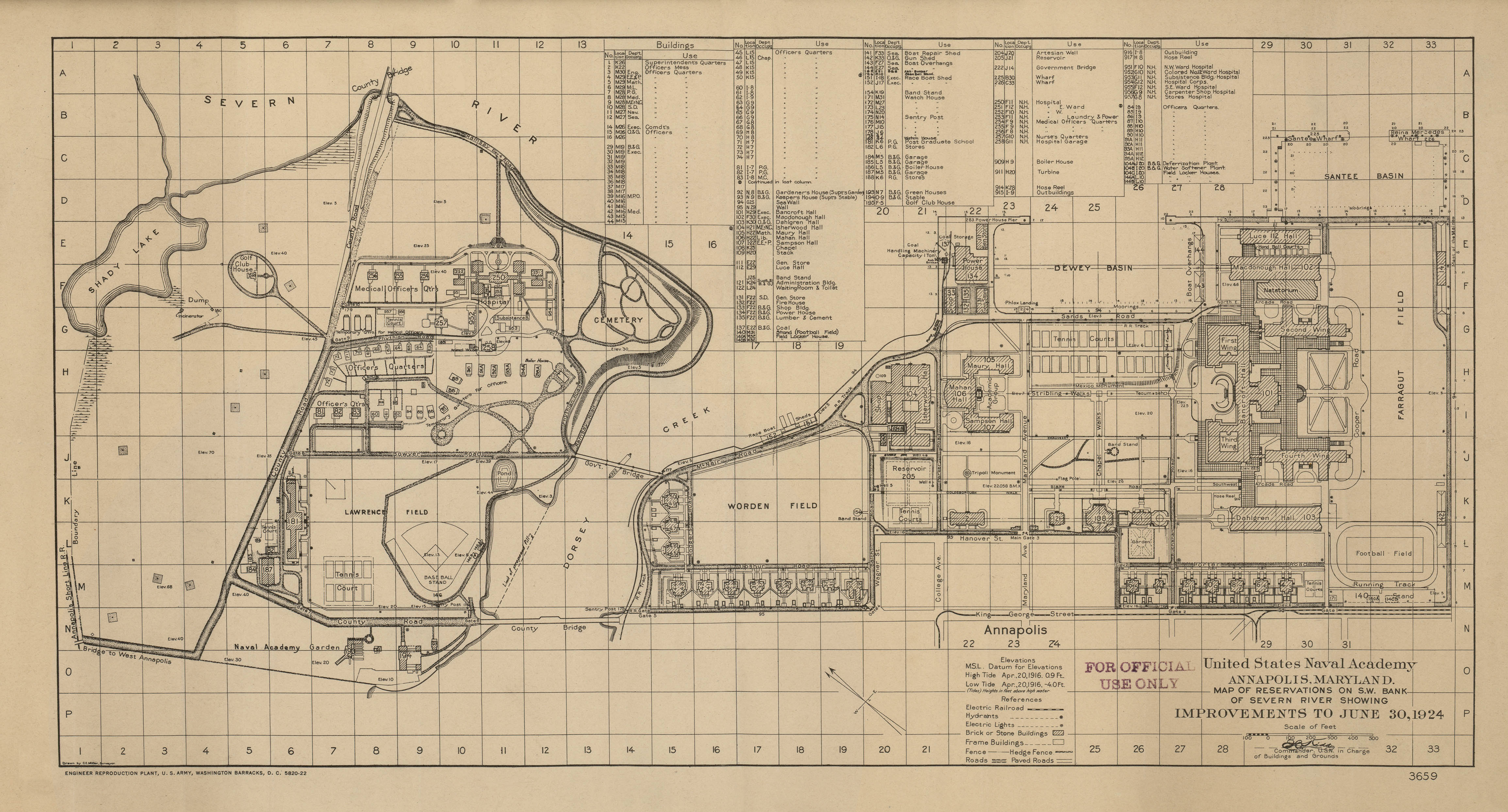
A map of the Naval Academy campus in 1924. Bancroft Hall is located on the far right, the largest building on the campus

Bancroft Hall, at the United States Naval Academy in Annapolis, Maryland, is said to be the largest contiguous set of academic dormitories in the U.S. Bancroft Hall, named after former U.S. Secretary of the Navy, and historian/author George Bancroft, is home for the entire brigade of 4,400 midshipmen, and contains some 1,700 rooms, 4.8 miles (7.7 km) of corridors, and 33 acres (13 ha) of floor space. All the basic facilities that midshipmen need for daily living are found in the hall. It is referred to as "Mother B" or "The Hall" by Midshipmen.

== History ==
Bancroft Hall was designed in the Beaux-Arts style with its mansard roof and dormer windows by architect Ernest Flagg and its central rotunda and first two wings were built in 1901–06. Over the intervening years it has been expanded to encompass eight wings of five stories ("decks") each numbered 0–4. The original two wings (1906) are now the 3rd and 4th wings; the next pair, added in 1917, are now the 1st and 2nd wings; a pair added in 1939 became the 5th and 6th wings; and a final pair were added in the 1961 as the 7th and 8th wings. The 3rd wing was built over the remains of the old Fort Severn.

In addition to the midshipmen rooms, Bancroft Hall houses offices for the Commandant of Midshipmen, six battalion officers, six battalion chaplains, thirty six company officers and their senior enlisted leaders, a barbershop, bank, travel office, a small restaurant known as "Steerage," textbook store, general store ("The Midshipmen Store"), laundromat, uniform store, cobbler shop, the USNA Band, the USNA branch of the United States Postal Service, a gym, a pistol range, spaces for extracurricular activities, a counseling and support center, and full medical & dental clinics as well as small optometry and orthopedics clinics. The Hall has its own ZIP code (21412).

A nine-year renovation project completed in 2003 by The Whiting-Turner Contracting Company and RTKL Associates Inc. of Baltimore, Maryland included 1,600 miles (2,600 km) of wiring to equip the building with a modern data communication network.

The building also contains King Hall (named after Fleet Admiral Ernest King, (1878–1956), Chief of Naval Operations and Commander-in-Chief of the U.S. Fleet in the Second World War) where all 4400 midshipmen are fed simultaneously three times daily, and Memorial Hall (see below). Memorial Hall and the Rotunda of Bancroft Hall are open to the general public, but access to the rest of the building is normally limited to assigned Naval personnel or accompanied authorized visitors.

There are rooms in Bancroft dedicated to each Academy graduate Medal of Honor recipient in the United States Navy or Marine Corps.

== The Rotunda and Memorial Hall ==
Central to Bancroft Hall is the Rotunda, with wings on either side. Over the Rotunda is a large mural of the USS South Dakota (BB-57), during the Battle of the Santa Cruz Islands in World War II.

Memorial Hall is up the large staircase from the Rotunda. This hall contains the honor roll of over 2,660 Naval Academy alumni who have died in military operations; their names are listed by class year on the walls and includes non-graduates and midshipmen. In the front of the hall, opposite the entrance, is a panel containing the full names and class years of the 963 alumni who are listed as killed in action. This panel is organized by war and alphabetically by last name. Throughout the rest of the hall there are memorials and plaques to specific alumni or small groups of alumni. (Details about the lives of the men and women honored in Memorial Hall are catalogued at the Virtual Memorial Hall project.)

There are 489 panes of glass in the skylight.

Below Memorial Hall is Smoke Hall.

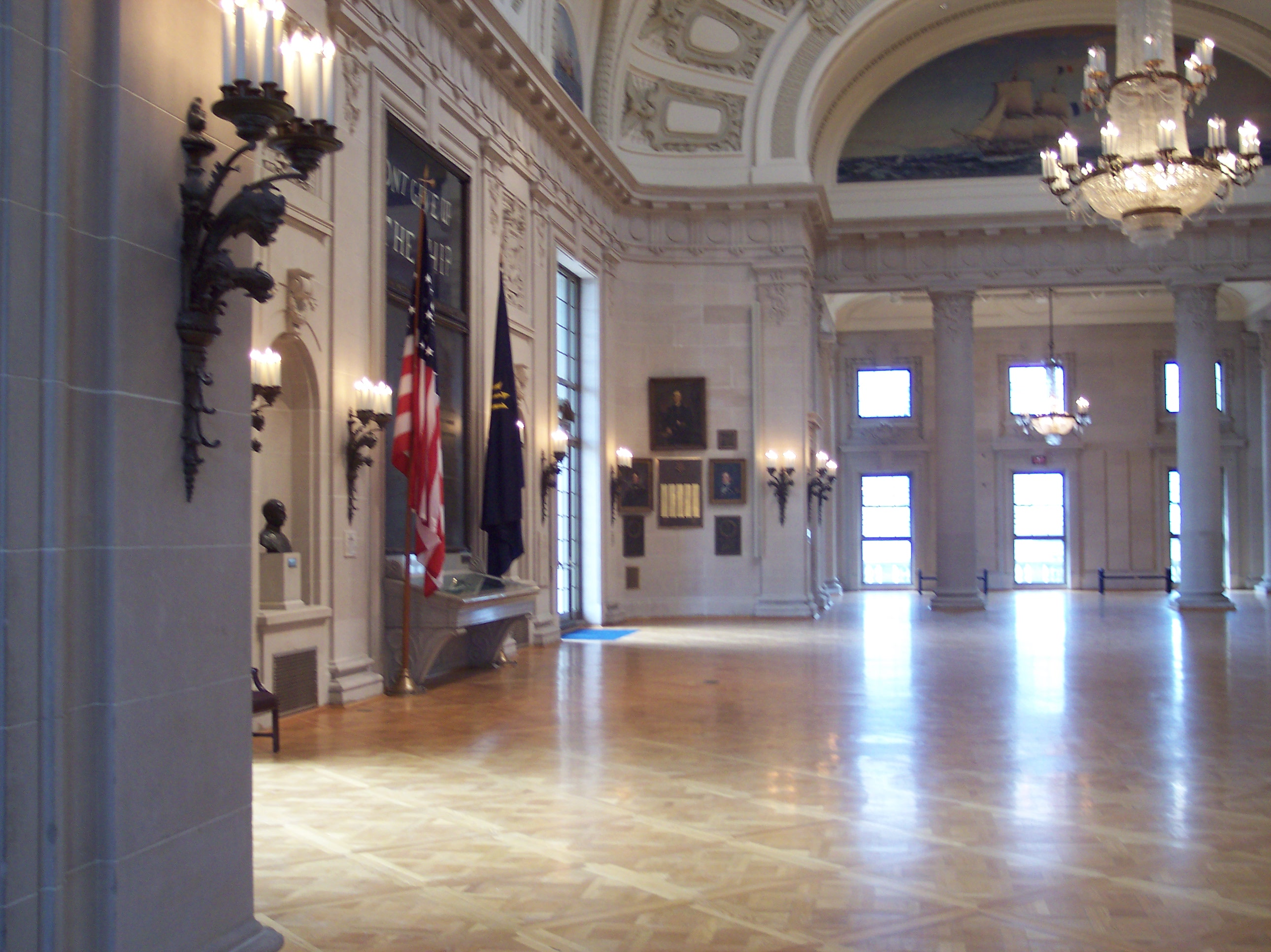
A view of the inside of Memorial Hall (part of Bancroft Hall)

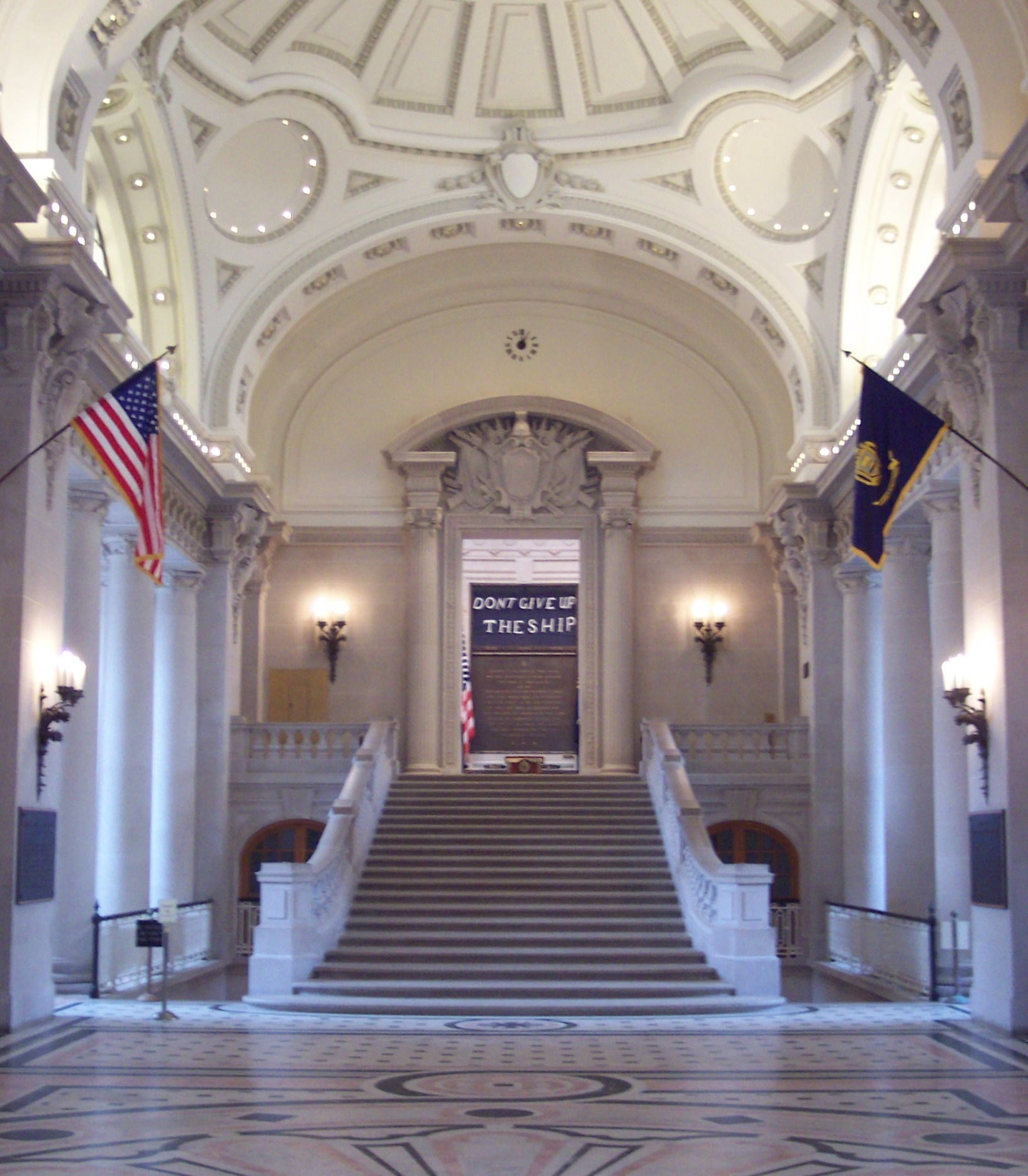
Another view of the steps leading to Memorial Hall (in Bancroft Hall)

=== Memorial Hall Dedication ===
The Dedication in Memorial Hall was written by William Nathaniel Thomas, Chaplain USNA (1892–1971) who was the seventh US Navy Chief of Chaplains (1945–1949). Memorial Hall within Bancroft Hall honors those United States Naval Academy alumni lost in combat or military operations in service to their country. In 1952 after soliciting suggestions for the dedication, Royal S. Pease, Professor, Department of English, USNA, wrote Chaplain Thomas "...There was a very widespread search for this and scores of suggestions were made. None seemed at all satisfactory until yours was presented. It was at once seized upon as being the right sort of thing: in the right spirit and in the right phrase. Widespread criticism was invited... but they found none to improve upon yours. It is now in Memorial Hall, below the 'Don't Give Up the Ship' flag."

In the aftermath of the 1967 USS Liberty incident, the Navy balked at listing Lieutenant Commander Philip Armstrong Jr. and Lieutenant Stephen Toth, two Liberty crew members, on the memorial wall. It took Chairman of the Joint Chiefs of Staff Admiral Thomas H. Moorer's personal intervention to reverse their decision; Moorer angrily commented on the Academy's attempt to omit the names: "I intervened and was able to reverse the apparent idea that dying in a cowardly, one-sided attack by a supposed ally is somehow not the same as being killed by an avowed enemy."

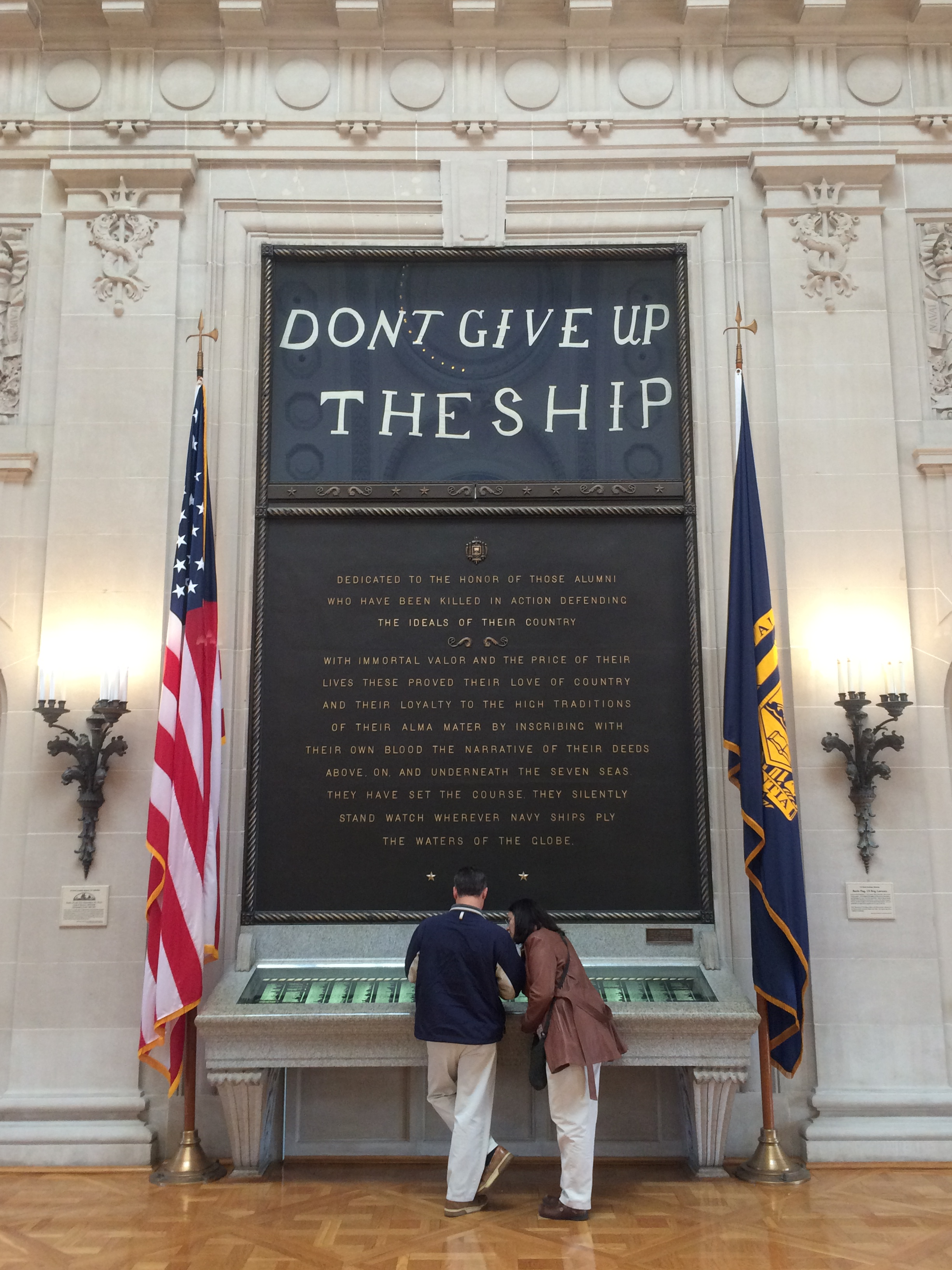
Dedication in Memorial Hall USNA

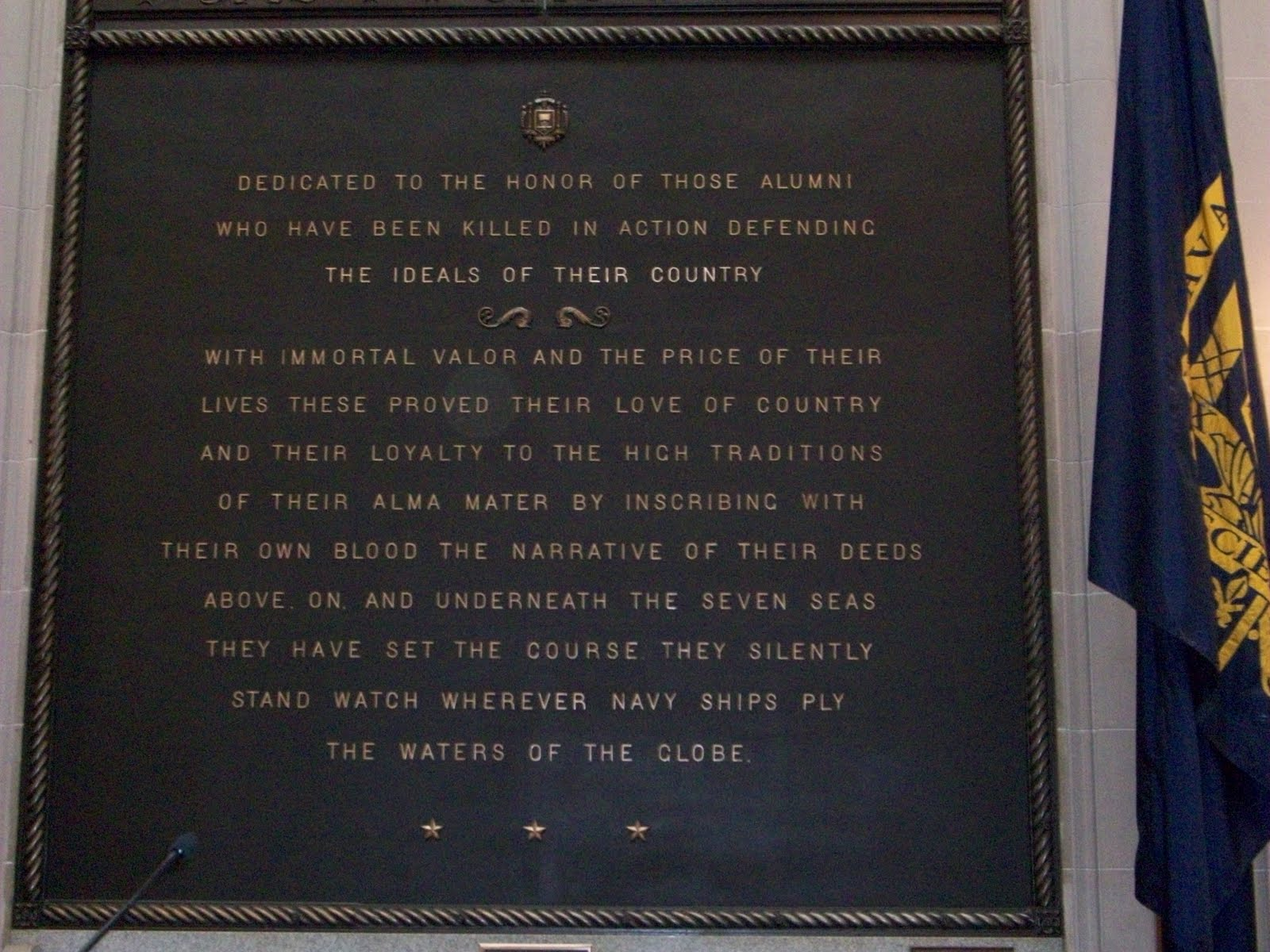
Dedication Plaque in Memorial Hall

== Commander-in-Chief's Trophy ==
The Commander-in-Chief's Trophy is awarded to each season's winner of the triangular college football series among the United States Naval Academy (Navy Midshipmen), the United States Military Academy (Army Black Knights), and the United States Air Force Academy (Air Force Falcons). When Navy has possession of the trophy, it is displayed in a glass case in the Rotunda.
