= William Nathaniel Thomas =

Chief of Chaplains William Nathaniel Thomas
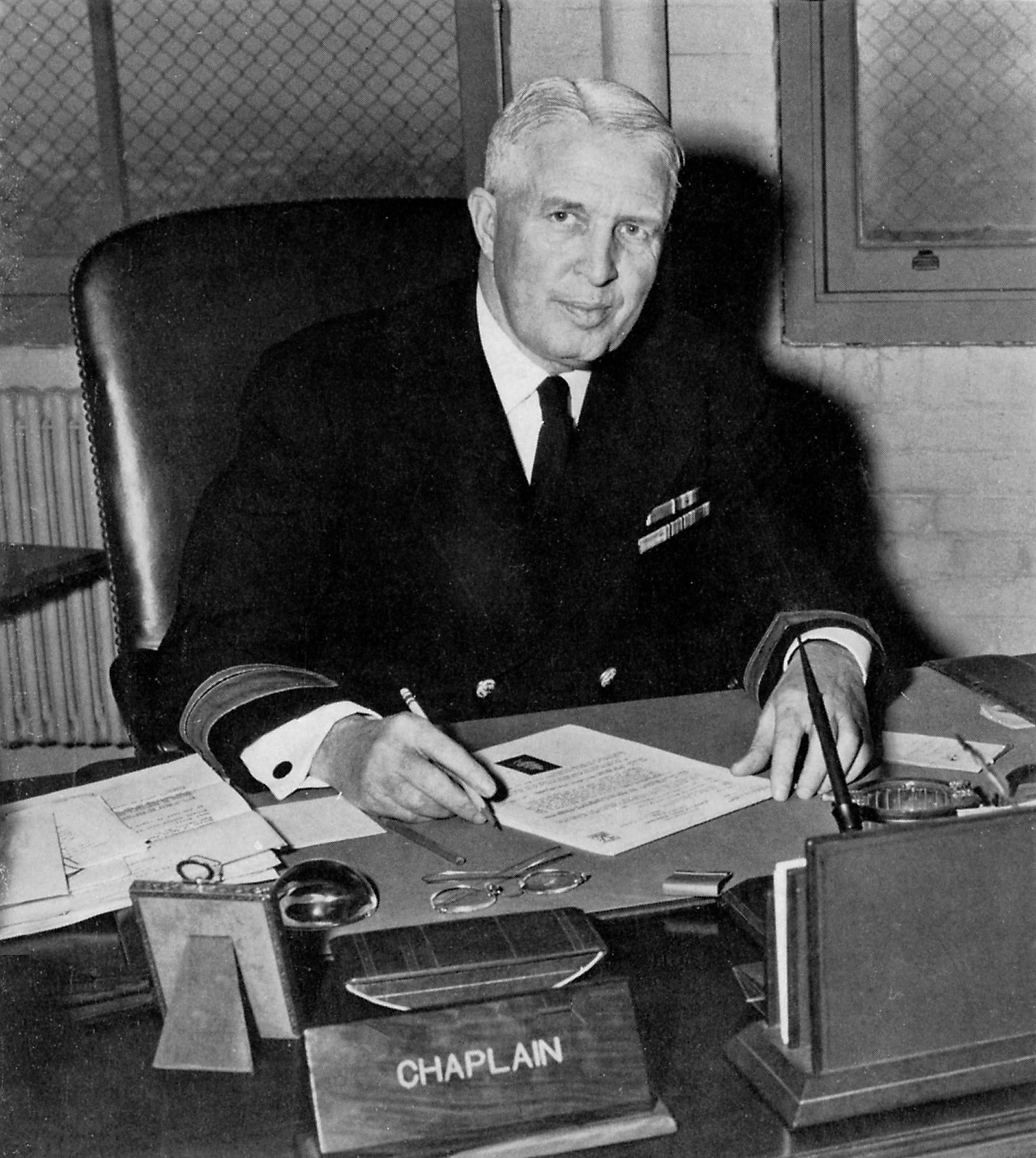
- Born: William Nathaniel Thomas; March 21, 1892; Piney Woods, Mississippi
- Died: April 26, 1971 (aged 79); Lake Junaluska, North Carolina
- Burial place: Arlington National Cemetery
- Spouse: Ellen Fondren Thomas (married March 1913)
- Children: William N. Thomas, Jr., John Edward Thomas
- Relatives: William N. Thomas, Jr.
- Military career
- Allegiance: United States of America
- Branch: Navy
- Service years: 1918–1949
- Rank: Rear Admiral
- Unit: Navy Chaplains Corps
- Commands: Chief of Chaplains of the U.S. Navy; Command Chaplain of the U.S. Naval Academy; USS Pennsylvania; Assistant Chaplain of the U.S. Naval Academy; USS West Virginia; USS Raleigh; USS Madawaska; shipboard captain
- Awards: Legion of Merit; Victory Medal with Transport class; Victory Medal World War II; the American Defense Campaign Service Ribbon; American Area Campaign Ribbon;
- Other work: Chaplain of the Lake Junaluska Methodist Church

William Nathaniel Thomas (March 21, 1892 – April 26, 1971) was a US Navy chief of chaplains, described by one historian as "one of the most distinguished Chaplains ever to serve in the US Navy." Born in Mississippi and entering the navy in 1918, he became a rear admiral and was a chief of chaplains of the United States Navy (1945–1949). He was chaplain aboard the USS Madawaska, a World War I troop transport. He then served on the USS Pennsylvania, the USS Raleigh and the USS West Virginia. He served at the United States Naval Academy in Annapolis, Maryland, as an assistant chaplain and then as command chaplain. He wrote the Prayer of the Midshipman and the Dedication in Memorial Hall at the Naval Academy.

== Early life and education ==
"Will" Thomas, the oldest of seven children, was born March 21, 1892, in Cato, the Piney Woods region of Rankin County, Mississippi. His grandfather, William Thomas (1822-1890) was born in Connecticut and married the widow, Naomi Graham in 1867, a Choctaw. His father worked for the Finkbine lumber company, moved to D'Lo, Mississippi, and was a founder of the D'Lo Methodist Church. Thomas attended the D’Lo Methodist church, which was across the street from where he lived. It was there that he got his religious calling. He got his preacher’s license when he was sixteen.

He worked his way through Millsaps College, a small but recognized institution in Jackson, Mississippi, where he graduated with honors in 1912. His quote in the Millsaps 1912 yearbook reads "To do good rather than be conspicuous." Thomas' ministry began in Danville, Mississippi as he simultaneously served many churches as a rural circuit-rider. He married Martha Ellen Fondren, a member of one of his congregations, on February 18, 1913, when they were both 21 years old. She said "she would never marry a preacher ...but that was before she met Will Thomas." She accompanied him as he covered his circuit by horse and buggy. He attended Seashore Divinity School from 1913-1915 and was ordained in the Methodist Episcopal Church, South by Bishop J. Atkins on November 28, 1915. He attended the Chicago Theological Seminary in 1926. He was later awarded an honorary Doctor of Divinity from Millsaps College in 1935.

== Early career: naval service from World War I until the Naval Academy duty 1933 ==
When America entered World War I in 1917, he went to Washington to join the army, which didn’t need chaplains, so he was referred to the navy. He had never seen a naval officer. Following indoctrination at the Boston Navy Yard, Massachusetts, he received his naval appointment January 5, 1918, and was assigned to the USS Madawaska, a transport ship, which moved soldiers of the American Expeditionary Force to Europe and back. He served aboard the USS Madawaska from February 1918 to September 1919. He said that, when signing up as a navy chaplain, he was asked whether he wanted to be in the regular navy or the reserve and he chose the former. When World War I was over, he planned to return to civilian ministry but was informed that, as a member of the regular navy, he was obliged to remain aboard the transport as it brought soldiers back, so he crossed the Atlantic a total of 28 times. Thomas soon found that he loved the navy, its people and all of his subsequent assignments.

His first shore duty, from September 1919 to February 1922, was at the US Public Service Hospital, Fort Lyon, Colorado, which had formerly served as a tuberculosis hospital. Many of the patients there had been gassed in the war. He was commissioned as a lieutenant on November 3, 1920. He then served aboard USS Pennsylvania from February 1922 to July 1924.

Thomas' first tour at the Naval Academy was as assistant chaplain from 1924 to 1927 under Chaplain Sidney K. Evans, who later became Chief of Chaplains from 1929 to 1935. In addition to regular duties, he held services on the USS Reina Mercedes that was docked at the Academy and used as a disciplinary barracks. He was promoted to lieutenant commander November 2, 1924, and then commander November 3, 1924. He then served a two-year tour from October 1927 to October 1929 aboard the USS Raleigh for a State Department goodwill tour of Europe and Africa. It had been said that "He had prayed over and for more foreign dignitaries, of every shape, dress, nationality and race than any other Navy Chaplain." His next tour was as the chaplain of the 14th Naval District at Pearl Harbor, Hawaii, from November 1929 to July 1932. His final sea duty, from July 1932 to May 1933, was aboard the USS West Virginia during the Great Depression.

== Senior Chaplain of the United States Naval Academy ==
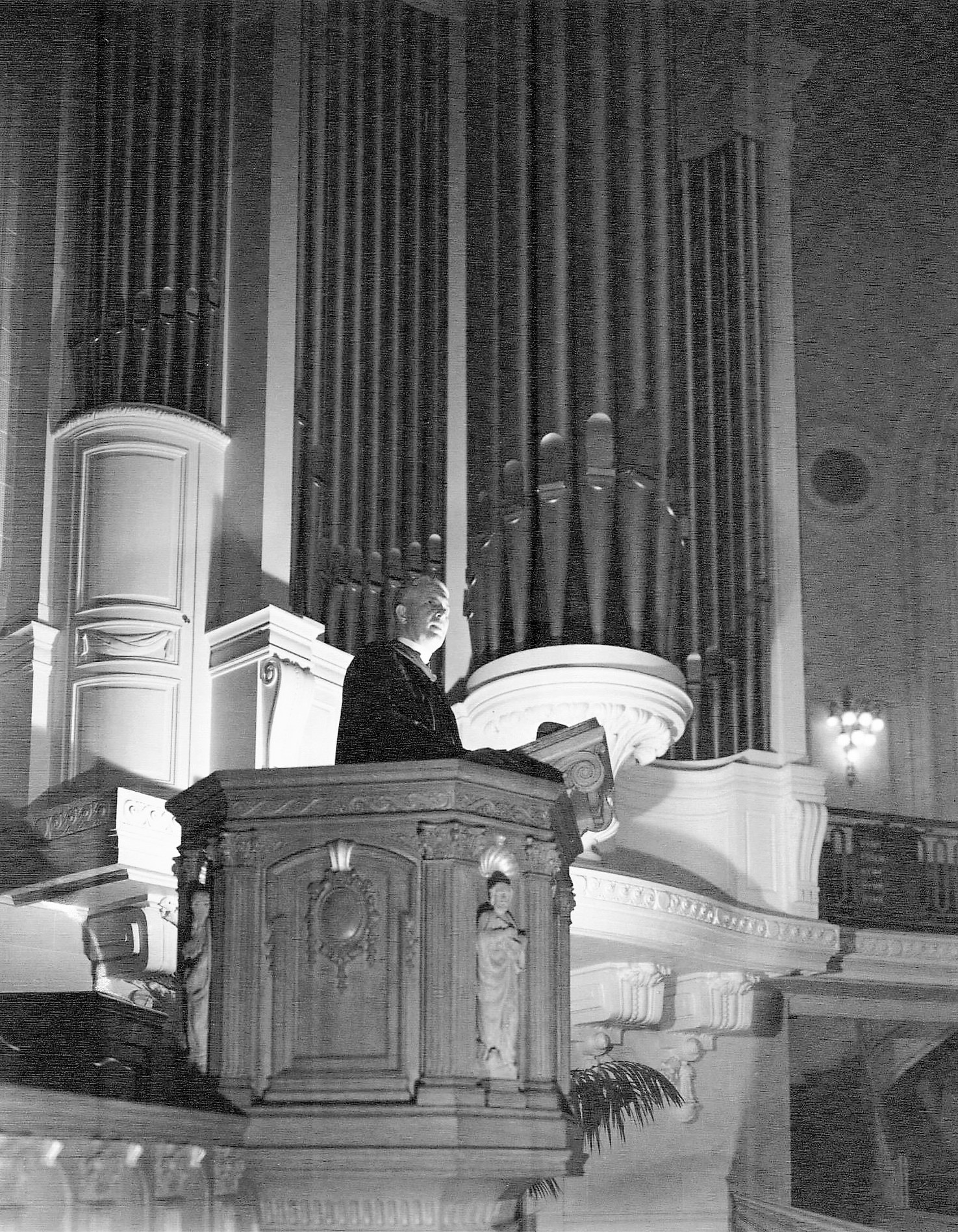
Chaplain Thomas in pulpit at USNA Chapel 1940

The highlight of Thomas’ career was at the Naval Academy as command chaplain from June 1933 to June 1945 when so many became acquainted with him as midshipmen, instructors, administrative staff and students at the Naval Postgraduate School. His twelve-year tenure at the academy was unprecedented.

For many years the authorship of The Midshipman Prayer was unknown. In 1938 Thomas wrote the prayer at the request of some midshipmen. It is said to encompass much of his theology and his ideal of a naval officer. He never sought credit for the prayer. It has been used at Divine Service in the Naval Academy Chapel ever since. A bronze plaque of the prayer resides in the chapel.

While at the academy, he performed 800 weddings and 700 baptisms. At graduation time he often had services 30 minutes apart as he alternated between the upper and lower chapels. His duties included the academy's Christian Association. He also addressed many civic associations, graduations, and regularly entertained midshipmen in their home as command chaplain.

He oversaw the enlargement of the Academy Chapel, referred to as the “Cathedral of the Navy.” The nave was extended by a thousand seats converting the design of the chapel from a Greek to a Latin cross with 2500 seats. He replaced the cannons with anchors on the chapel entrance believing "that religion should be the anchor of a naval officer's life". A new pulpit was created and a votive ship installed. The completed Chapel was re-dedicated on April 28, 1940, with Thomas presiding. He was instrumental in bringing the Jewish clergy to the Academy.

He brought to the pulpit of the academy some of the finest ministers in America: Dean Luther Weigle, Peter Marshall and Ralph Sockman. On December 7, 1941, Peter Marshall, visiting minister from the New York Presbyterian Church of Washington, D.C. asked Thomas if he might change his announced topic. Peter Marshall then delivered a most famous sermon, "Rendezvous in Samarra" about death and immortality to the assembled regiment of Midshipmen. After chapel all were to learn of the attack on Pearl Harbor. Thomas had served on board three ships that were at Pearl Harbor: the USS Pennsylvania the USS Raleigh and the USS West Virginia. Before his sermons, Thomas would honor the members of the Naval Academy graduates who had died in service. In 1943 he received an honorary Doctor of Divinity from American University in Washington, D.C.

== After the war ==
He was one of 39 chaplains to serve in both World War I and World War II. Thomas would have preferred remaining at the Naval Academy but became the seventh chief of chaplains in Washington, D.C., on July 1, 1945. He held commission Number One as rear admiral of the upper half in the Chaplain Corps but preferred to be addressed as "Chaplain", maintaining that "the title of admiral properly belonged to a lord of the sea." He much preferred his professional life, being first a minister and second a naval officer, to an administrative position.

After the surrender of Japan, President Truman asked Thomas and the Army Chief of Chaplains, Luther D. Miller, to conduct a service of thanksgiving at the White House.

At the end of the War, Beginning with a Corps of 2811 chaplains, Thomas effectively oversaw the demobilization and discharge of chaplains. He had "civil readjustment" chaplains assigned to centers so chaplain dischargees could talk with a chaplain before leaving the service. He oversaw the creation of many chapels, many at closed naval installations, with the support of the Chief of Naval Operations and President Truman with the three major faith groups represented. These were available to church groups in the local civilian community.

Thomas brought completion to the first historical volumes of the Chaplain Corps. District chaplains were given added prominence and the first District Chaplains Conference was held in 1946. Under the leadership of Thomas, the first official manual ever issued for the use of the Chaplain Corps was issued was in August 1947. He helped formalize post-graduate studies for chaplains. It is thought that the circuit riding chaplaincy ministry on destroyers was based on Thomas having been a circuit rider in Mississippi. In January 1947 Thomas was awarded the Legion of Merit.

In 1952 Thomas wrote the Dedication in Memorial Hall in Bancroft Hall of the US Naval Academy that was placed beneath the "Dont Give up the Ship" flag.

== Retirement ==
Thomas retired from active duty in 1949. Upon retirement he and Mrs. Thomas moved to Lake Junaluska Methodist Assembly near Waynesville, North Carolina, where he resided until his death. He served as dean of the Memorial Chapel at Lake Junaluska. He preached in many of the local churches. When asked if he had any difficulties serving the different denominations, he said, "Not at all. I dehydrated the Baptists, thawed out the Presbyterians and quieted down the shouting Methodists." He was active in civic affairs and belonged to a large number of both military and civilian organizations. Frequently in demand as a speaker, his most popular speech was "The Definition of a Gentleman." He pursued his lifelong interests in golf, reading, gardening, woodworking, and performing weddings. He said, "He would prefer to tee off on the golf course than to do it at people." He suffered two strokes in his last days and died April 26, 1971, at the age of 79.

== Personal life ==
Thomas was married to Martha Ellen Fondren (1892–1990) on February 18, 1913. They had two children both of whom served in the US Navy.

William Nathaniel Thomas Jr. (1919–2013) was a 1942 medical graduate from University of Virginia, Charlottesville. In October 1943 he received his naval commission, attained the rank of lieutenant in the medical corps and was wounded on Okinawa as a battalion surgeon with the first Marine Division. After the war he became a radiologist in Annapolis, Maryland.

John Edward Thomas (1930–1993) graduated from University of Virginia, Charlottesville, with a degree in psychology. He entered the navy in 1952 and served for three years during the Korean War. He attained the rank of lieutenant junior grade and was an executive ship officer.

== Death ==
Thomas had requested a simple funeral. There was a memorial service at the United States Naval Academy Chapel in Annapolis. He is buried on Chaplains Hill at Arlington National Cemetery, Virginia, where he was joined by his wife in 1990.

He is to have said, "A Chaplain's personal life is his most effective sermon." In 1980 the walk encircling the Naval Academy Chapel was named in his honor.

== Honors and awards ==
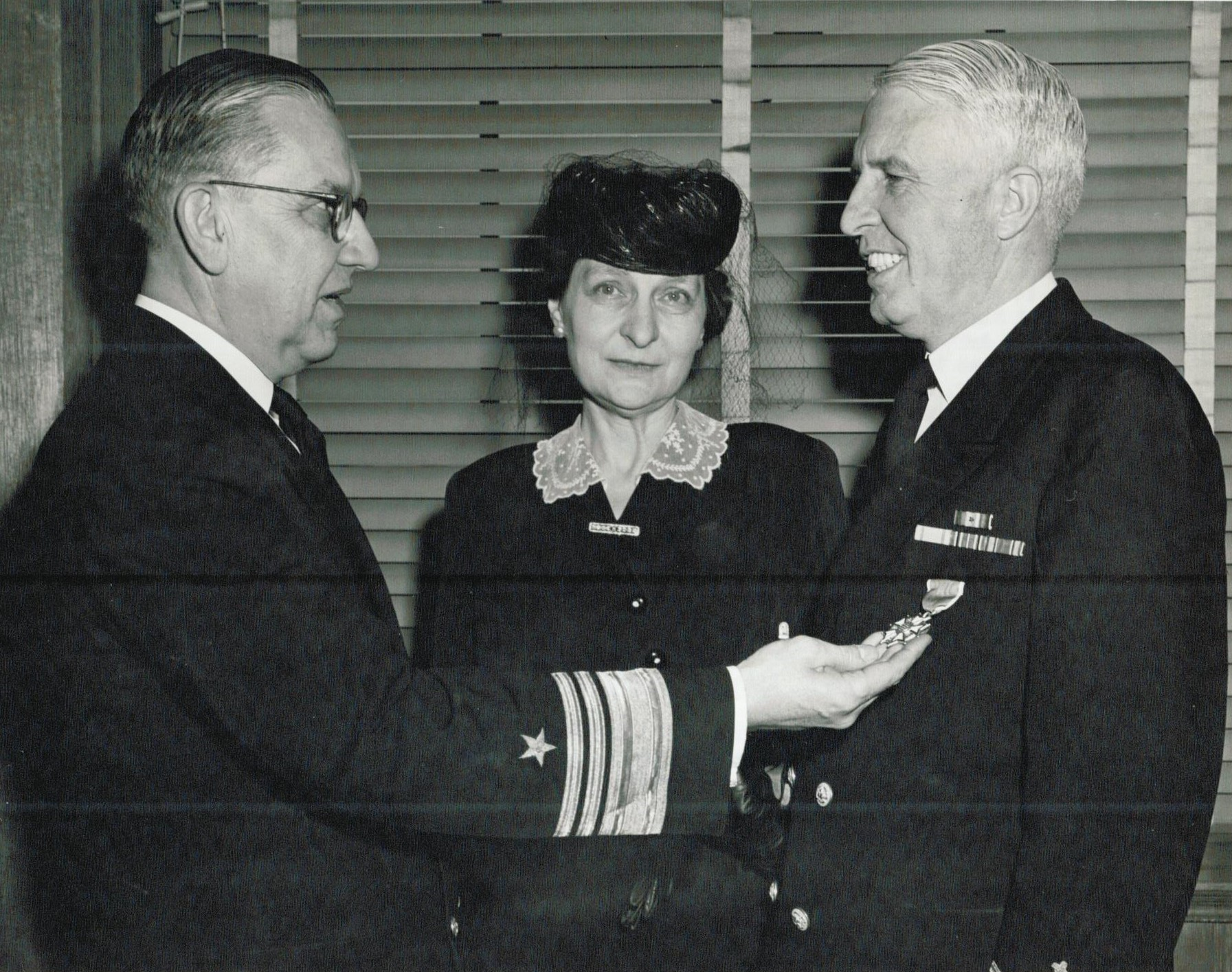
Chaplain Thomas Legion of Merit Presentation 1947

- Victory Medal with Transport Clasp
- American Defense Campaign Service Ribbon
- American Area Campaign Ribbon
- Victory Medal, WWII
- Legion of Merit 1947
- Honorary Doctor of Divinity from the Millsaps College in 1935.
- Honorary Doctor of Divinity from American University in 1943

== Notable works and legacy ==
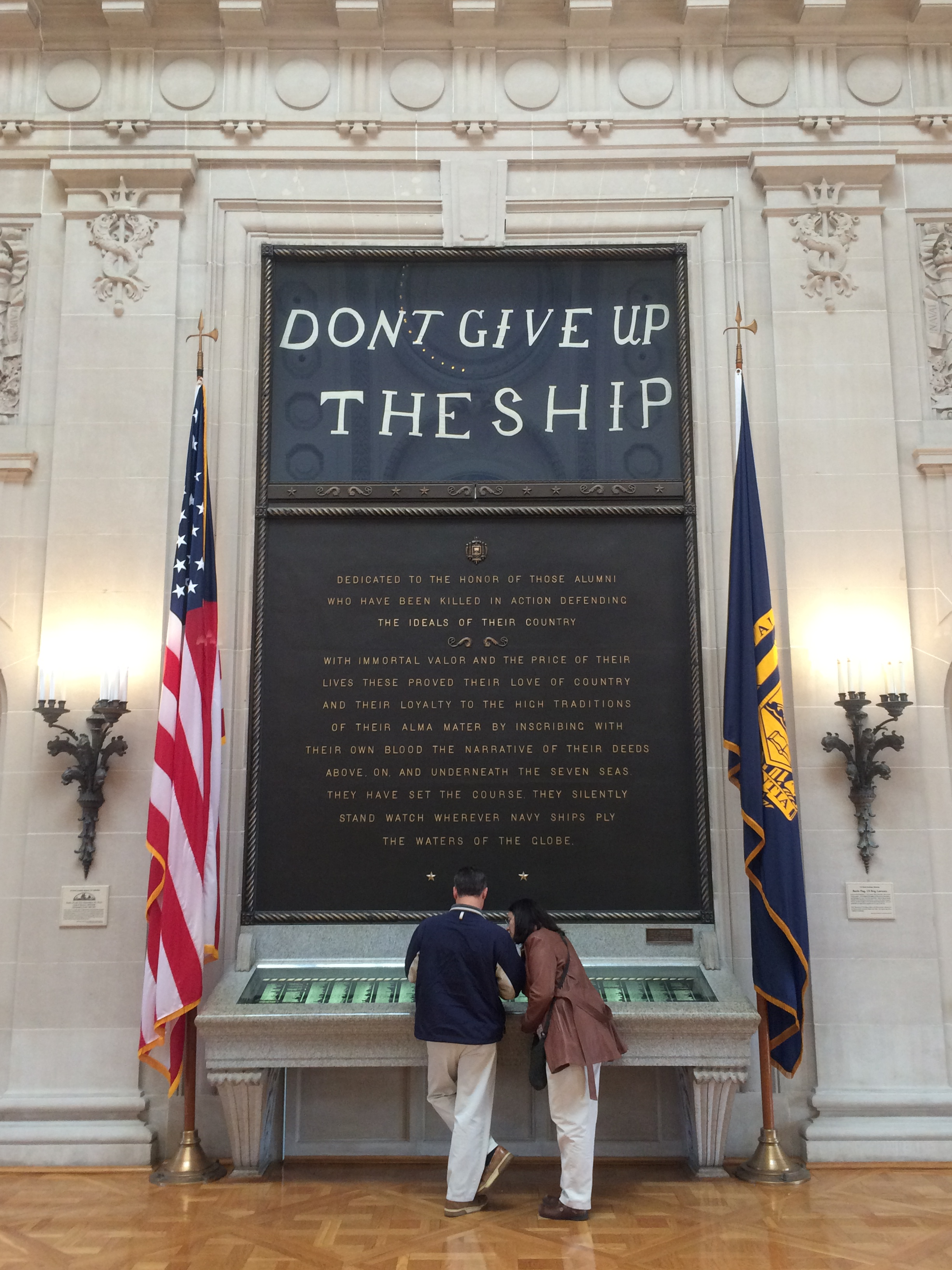
Memorial Dedication in Bancroft Hall USNA 1952

- The Prayer of a Midshipman in 1938
- The Dedication in Memorial Hall at the US Naval Academy
- Thomas Walk encircling the USNA Chapel
