= USS Laboon =

American guided-missile destroyer

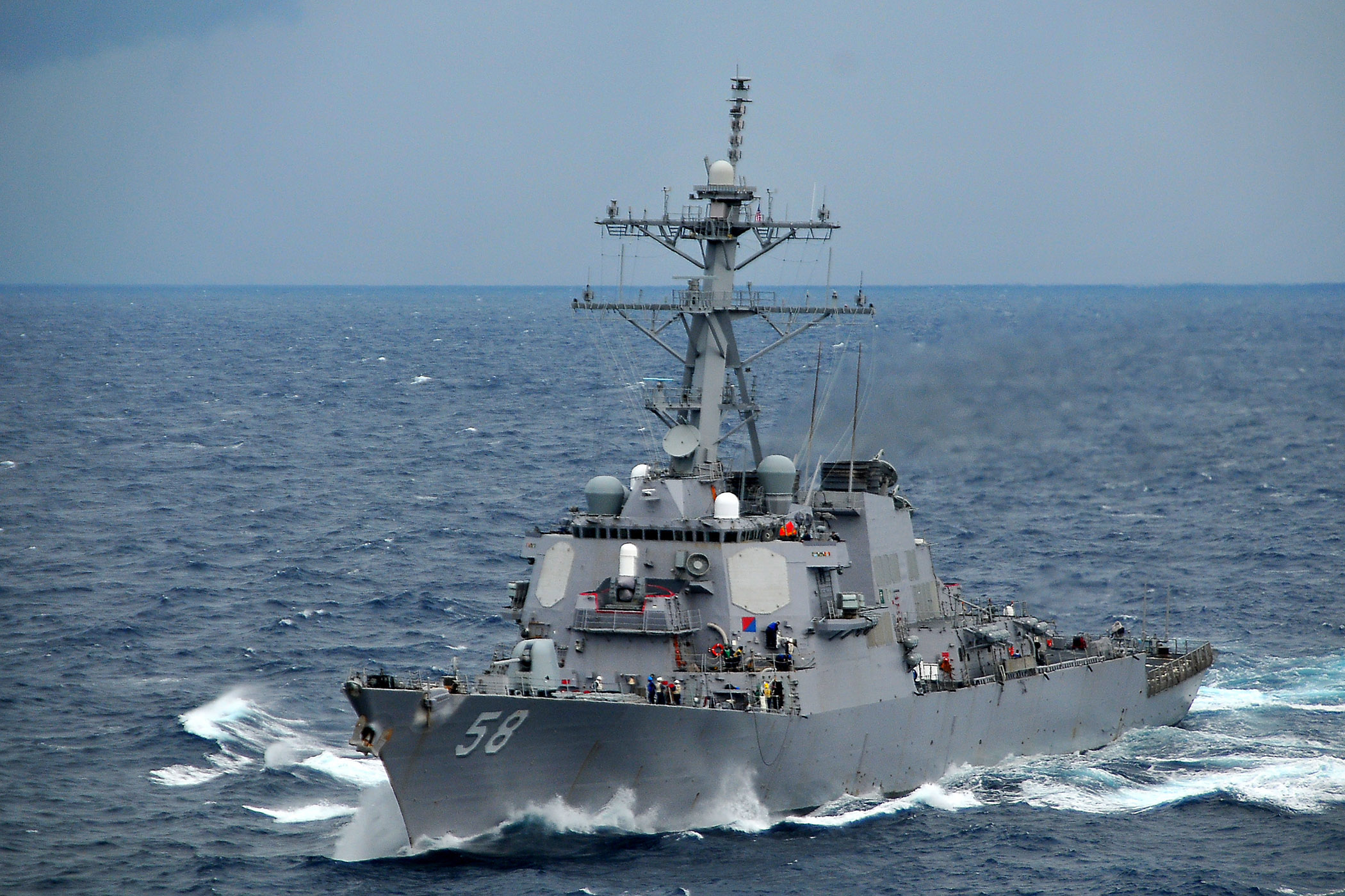
- USS Laboon on 9 February 2010

History

United States
- Name: Laboon
- Namesake: John Francis Laboon
- Ordered: 13 December 1988
- Builder: Bath Iron Works
- Laid down: 23 March 1992
- Launched: 20 February 1993
- Commissioned: 18 March 1995
- Home port: Norfolk
- Identification: MMSI number: 36690000; Callsign: NJFL; Hull number: DDG-58
- Motto: Without Fear
- Status: in active service
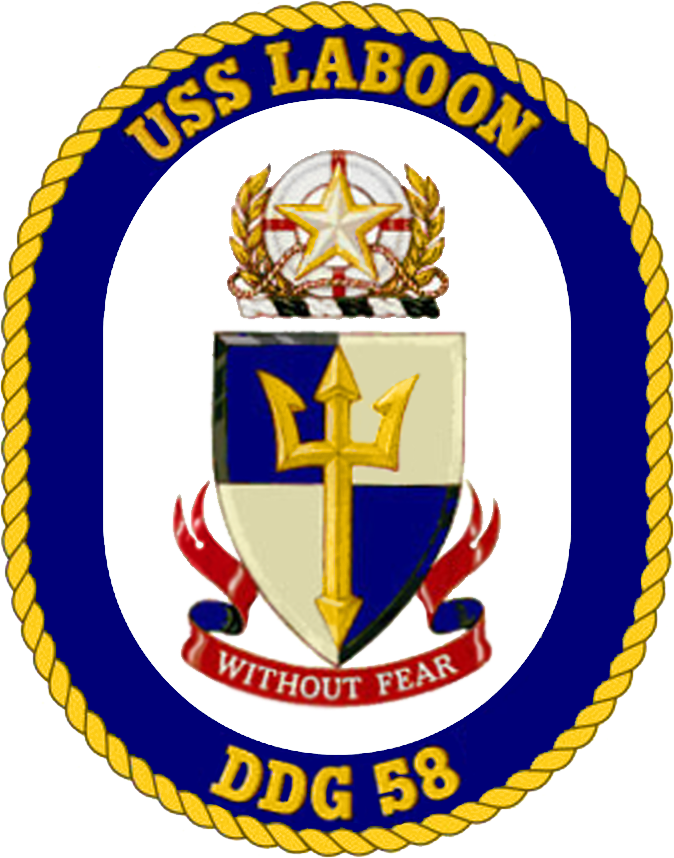
- Badge

General characteristics
- Class & type: Arleigh Burke-class destroyer
- Displacement: Light: approx. 6,800 long tons (6,900 t); Full: approx. 8,900 long tons (9,000 t)
- Length: 505 ft (154 m)
- Beam: 59 ft (18 m)
- Draft: 31 ft (9.4 m)
- Propulsion: 2 × shafts
- Speed: In excess of 30 kn (56 km/h; 35 mph)
- Range: 4,400 nmi (8,100 km; 5,100 mi) at 20 kn (37 km/h; 23 mph)
- Complement: 33 commissioned officers; 38 chief petty officers; 210 enlisted personnel
- Sensors & processing systems: AN/SPY-1D PESA 3D radar (Flight I, II, IIA); AN/SPY-6(V)1 AESA 3D radar (Flight III); AN/SPS-67(V)3 or (V)5 surface search radar (DDG-51 – DDG-118); AN/SPQ-9B surface search radar (DDG-119 onward); AN/SPS-73(V)12 surface search/navigation radar (DDG-51 – DDG-86); BridgeMaster E surface search/navigation radar (DDG-87 onward); 3 × AN/SPG-62 fire-control radar; Mk 46 optical sight system (Flight I, II, IIA); Mk 20 electro-optical sight system (Flight III); AN/SQQ-89 ASW combat system: AN/SQS-53C sonar array; AN/SQR-19 tactical towed array sonar (Flight I, II, IIA); TB-37U multi-function towed array sonar (DDG-113 onward); AN/SQQ-28 LAMPS III shipboard system
- Electronic warfare & decoys: AN/SLQ-32 electronic warfare suite; AN/SLQ-25 Nixie torpedo countermeasures; Mk 36 Mod 12 decoy launching systems; Mk 53 Nulka decoy launching systems; Mk 59 decoy launching systems
- Armament: Guns: 1 × 5-inch (127 mm)/54 mk 45 mod 1/2 (lightweight gun); 2 × 20 mm (0.8 in) Phalanx CIWS; 2 × 25 mm (0.98 in) Mk 38 machine gun system; 4 × 0.50 inches (12.7 mm) caliber guns; Missiles: 2 × Mk 141 Harpoon anti-ship missile launcher; 1 × 29-cell, 1 × 61-cell (90 total cells) Mk 41 vertical launching system (VLS): RIM-66M surface-to-air missile; RIM-156 surface-to-air missile; BGM-109 Tomahawk cruise missile; RUM-139 vertical launch ASROC; Torpedoes: 2 × Mark 32 triple torpedo tubes: Mark 46 lightweight torpedo; Mark 50 lightweight torpedo; Mark 54 lightweight torpedo
- Aircraft carried: 1 × Sikorsky MH-60R

USS Laboon (DDG-58) is an Arleigh Burke-class (Flight I) Aegis guided missile destroyer in the United States Navy. She is named for Father John Francis Laboon (1921–1988), a captain in the Chaplain Corps of the United States Navy, who was awarded the Silver Star during World War II while serving on the submarine USS Peto.

== Ship's history ==
Laboon's keel was laid down on 23 March 1992 at the Bath Iron Works shipyard in Bath, Maine. She was launched on 20 February 1993. Laboon was commissioned on 18 March 1995.

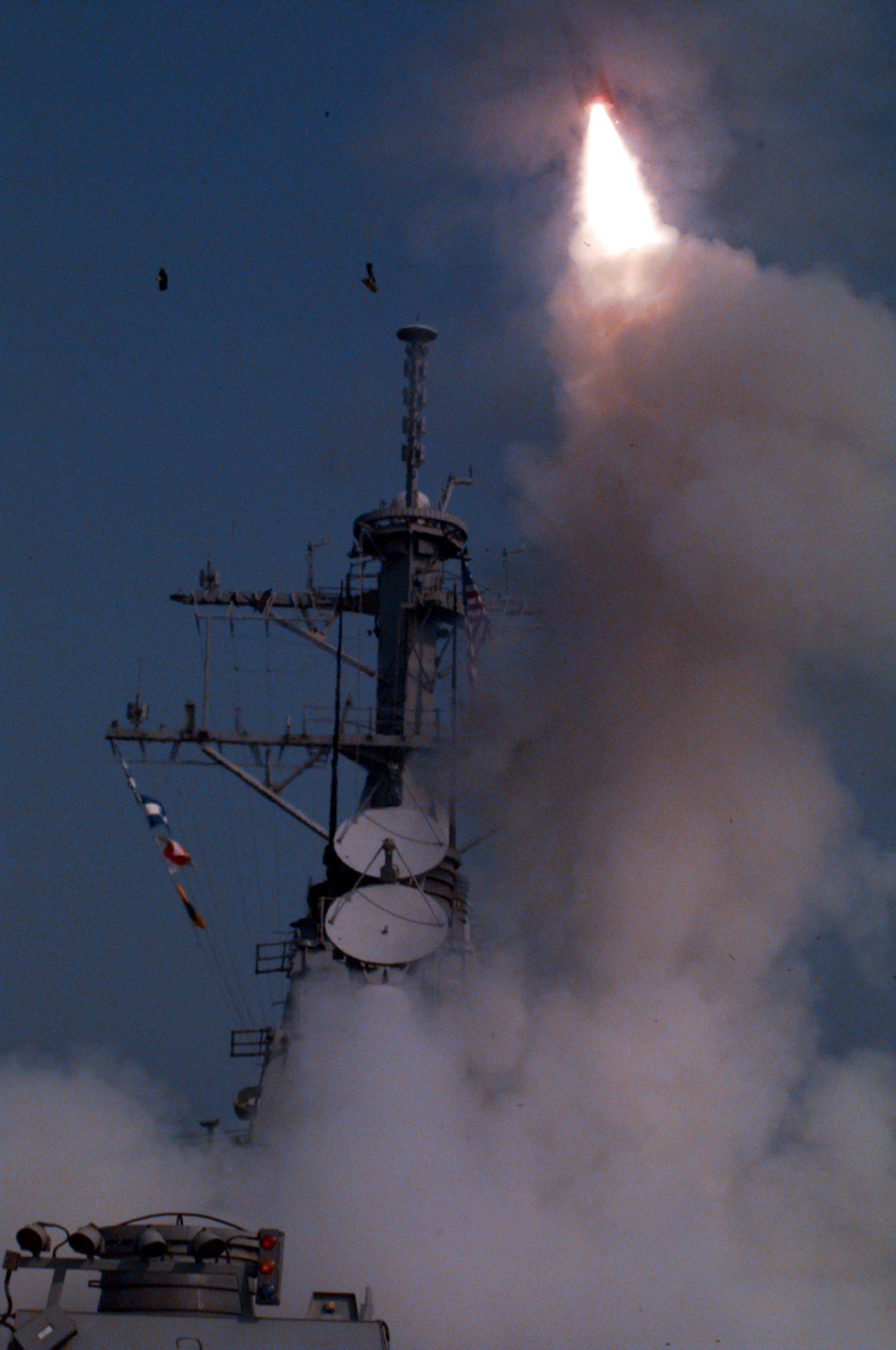
Laboon launches Tomahawk missile, 3 September 1996

In late 1996, she fired Tomahawk missiles at targets in Iraq, thus becoming the first Arleigh Burke-class destroyer to engage in combat.

In 1998, Laboon took part in NATO Exercise Dynamic Response 98, together with USS Wasp's Amphibious Ready Group.

On 12 September 2012, Laboon was ordered to the coast of Libya in what the Pentagon called a "contingency" in case a strike was ordered. This was in response to the 2012 diplomatic missions attacks.

On 21 June 2015, Laboon entered the Black Sea along with the French ship Dupuy de Lôme as part of NATO's presence missions following the Annexation of Crimea by the Russian Federation. While in the Black Sea, Laboon participated in joint maneuvers with a Romanian Navy Rear-Admiral Eustațiu Sebastian-class corvette for two days beginning on 22 June 2015. On 27 June 2015, Laboon began a two-day visit to the Black Sea port of Batumi, Georgia, to participate in training with the Coast Guard of Georgia and offer tours of the ship.

On 14 April 2018, she fired seven Tomahawk missiles from a position in the Red Sea as part of a bombing campaign in retaliation for the Syrian government's use of chemical weapons against people in Douma.

=== 2023 Israel-Hamas war ===
On 14 October 2023, U.S. Secretary of Defense Lloyd Austin directed Dwight D. Eisenhower and her carrier strike group, which includes the cruiser Philippine Sea, along with Laboon, and sister-destroyers Mason and Gravely, to the eastern Mediterranean in response to the Gaza war. This was the second carrier strike group to be sent to the region in response to the conflict, following Gerald R. Ford and her group, which was dispatched only six days earlier.

On 23 December 2023, while patrolling in the southern Red Sea, Laboon shot down four unmanned aerial attack drones that originated from areas controlled by the Iranian-backed Houthi rebels in Yemen and were inbound toward Laboon. On 26 December, Laboon shot down three anti-ship ballistic missiles in the Red Sea fired by Houthi rebels with multiple SM-6 missiles. This was the first intercept of a ballistic missile in combat.

On 6 January 2024, Laboon shot down a Houthi drone in the Red Sea. On 9 January, at approximately 9:15 p.m. (Sanaa time), Iranian-backed Houthis launched a complex attack of Iranian designed one-way attack unmanned aerial vehicles (OWA UAVs), anti-ship cruise missiles, and an anti-ship ballistic missile from Houthi-controlled areas of Yemen into the Southern Red Sea, towards international shipping lanes where dozens of merchant vessels were transiting. Eighteen OWA UAVs, two anti-ship cruise missiles, and one anti-ship ballistic missile were shot down by a combined effort of F/A-18 Super Hornet aircraft from Dwight D. Eisenhower, Gravely, Laboon, Mason, and the United Kingdom’s HMS Diamond. This was the 26th Houthi attack on commercial shipping lanes in the Red Sea since 19 November 2023. There were no injuries or damage reported. On 14 January, an anti-ship missile was fired in the direction of Laboon from a Houthi-controlled portion of Yemen, according to CENTCOM.

On 2 February 2024, Laboon and F/A-18 Super Hornets from Dwight D. Eisenhower shot down at least 12 drones launched by Houthis over the Red Sea. On 6 February at 4:30 p.m., while patrolling in the Gulf of Aden, Laboon, operating near the cargo ship MV Star Nasia, intercepted and shot down an anti-ship ballistic missile fired by the Iranian-backed Houthis. On 20 February at 12:30 a.m., while operating in the Gulf of Aden, Laboon detected and shot down one anti-ship cruise missile fired by the Houthis.

== Awards ==
- Combat Action Ribbon - (October 2023 - April 2024)
- Navy Unit Commendation - (2021 (IKE CSG), Oct-May 2024)
- Marjorie Sterrett Battleship Fund Award - (2012)
- Battenberg Cup - (2024)
- Arleigh Burke Fleet Trophy - (2024)
