= USS Rentz =

Oliver Hazard Perry-class guided missile frigate of the US Navy (in service 1984–2014)

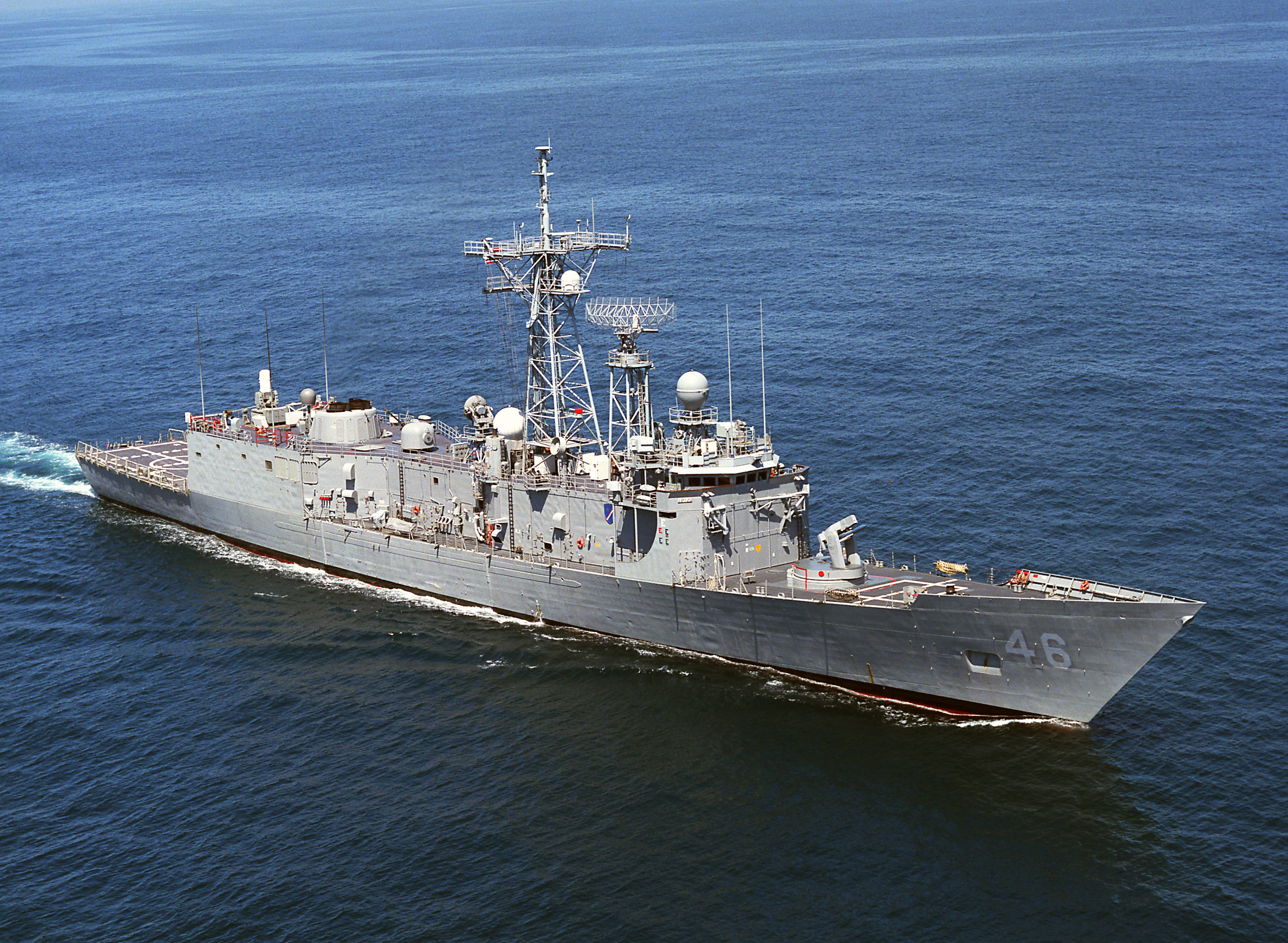
- USS Rentz (FFG-46), off San Diego, California, 4 April 1995.

History

United States
- Name: Rentz
- Namesake: Chaplain George S. Rentz
- Awarded: 28 April 1980
- Builder: Todd Pacific Shipyards, Los Angeles Division, San Pedro, California
- Laid down: 18 September 1982
- Launched: 16 July 1983
- Sponsored by: Mrs. Jean R. Lansing
- Commissioned: 30 June 1984
- Decommissioned: 23 May 2014
- Stricken: 23 May 2014
- Home port: Naval Base San Diego
- Identification: Callsign: NGSR
- Motto: "Dread Nought"
- Fate: Sunk as part of Valiant Shield 2016 SINKEX
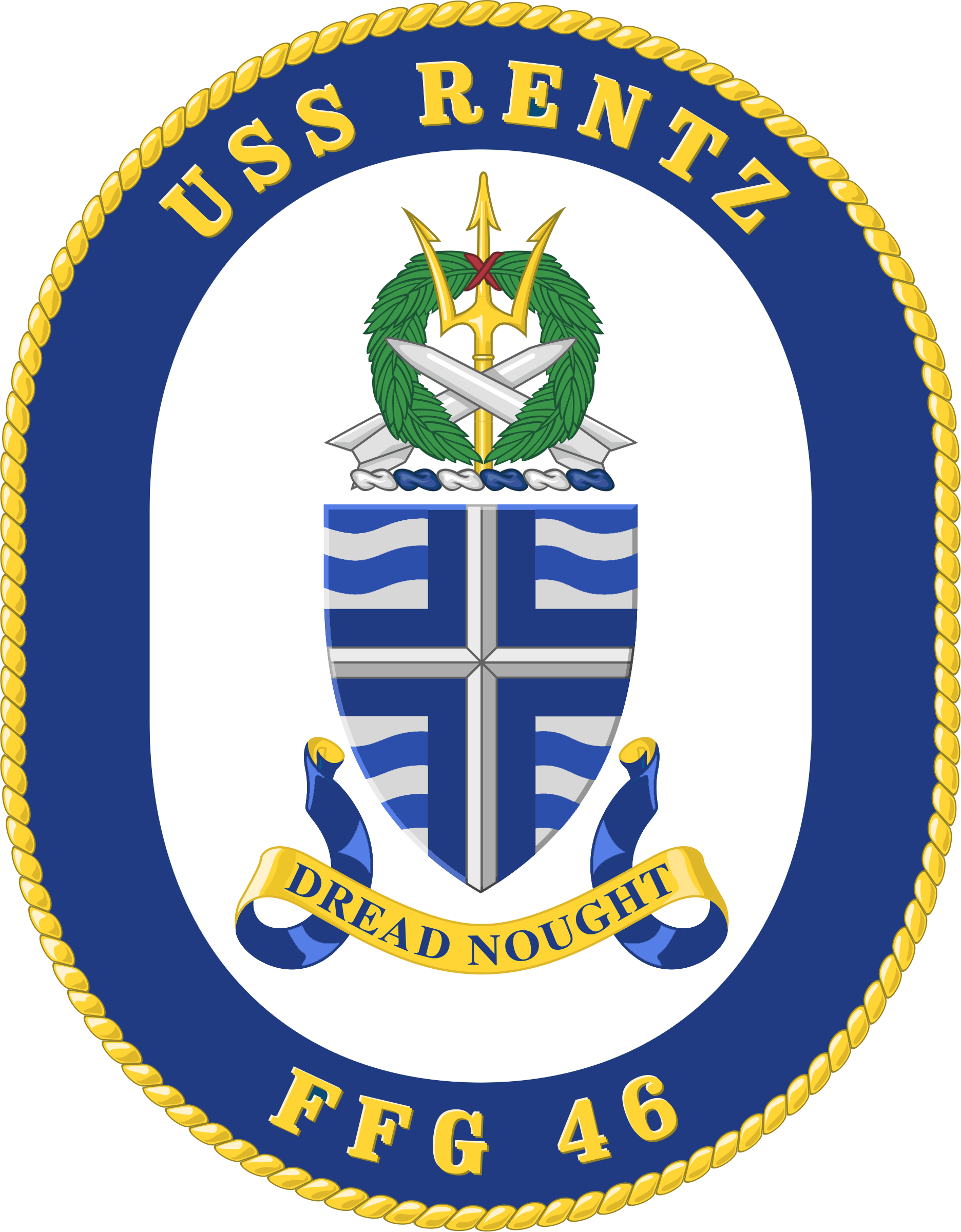
- Badge

General characteristics
- Class & type: Oliver Hazard Perry-class frigate
- Type: Frigate
- Displacement: 4,100 long tons (4,200 t), full load
- Length: 453 feet (138 m), overall
- Beam: 45 feet (14 m)
- Draft: 22 feet (6.7 m)
- Decks: 9
- Propulsion: 2 × General Electric LM2500-30 gas turbines generating 41,000 shp (31 MW) through a single shaft and variable pitch propeller; 2 × Auxiliary Propulsion Units, 350 hp (260 kW) retractable electric azimuth thrusters for maneuvering and docking.
- Speed: over 29 knots (54 km/h)
- Range: 5,000 nautical miles at 18 knots (9,300 km at 33 km/h)
- Complement: 15 officers and 190 enlisted, plus SH-60 LAMPS detachment of roughly six officer pilots and 15 enlisted maintainers
- Sensors & processing systems: AN/SPS-49 air-search radar; AN/SPS-55 surface-search radar; CAS and STIR fire-control radar; AN/SQS-56 sonar.
- Electronic warfare & decoys: AN/SLQ-32
- Armament: As built: 1 × OTO Melara Mk 75 76 mm/62 caliber naval gun; 2 × Mk 32 triple-tube (324 mm) launchers for Mark 46 torpedoes; 1 × Vulcan Phalanx CIWS; 4 × .50-cal (12.7 mm) machine guns.; 1 × Mk 13 Mod 4 single-arm launcher for Harpoon anti-ship missiles and SM-1MR Standard anti-ship/air missiles (40 round magazine); Note: As of 2004, Mk 13 systems removed from all active US vessels of this class.
- Aircraft carried: 2 × SH-60 LAMPS III helicopters
- Aviation facilities: 2 × hangars; RAST helicopter hauldown system

USS Rentz (FFG-46) was a United States Navy Oliver Hazard Perry-class guided missile frigate. She was named for George S. Rentz, a World War II Navy Chaplain, posthumously awarded the Navy Cross for actions following the loss of USS Houston in the Battle of Sunda Strait. He was the only Navy chaplain to be so honored during World War II.

== History ==
Rentz had her keel laid on 18 September 1982 at Todd Pacific Shipyards, Los Angeles Division, San Pedro, California. She was launched 16 July 1983, sponsored by Mrs. Jean R. Lansing, daughter of Chaplain Rentz, and commissioned at Naval Station Long Beach on 30 June 1984. In attendance were Jean Lansing and survivors of Houston.

In December 1985, Rentz moved from Long Beach, California to San Diego, California. Following initial shakedown cruises and operations, Rentz was assigned to the USS Ranger Carrier Strike Group (CSG). On 5 November 1986, Rentz was part of an historic visit to Qingdao, China, the first US Naval visit to China since 1949. Rentz was accompanied by cruiser USS Reeves and destroyer USS Oldendorf. The visit was officially hosted by the Chinese People's Liberation Army Navy (PLAN). Previously, USS Dixie was the last ship to moor in China, departing in 1949 when the communists forced the Americans to leave mainland China.

In July 1987, Rentz was sent to the Persian Gulf as part of Operation Earnest Will. Her primary duties consisted of escorting commercial vessels through the Strait of Hormuz. Rentz provided missile security escort for the North Persian Gulf Battlegroup destroyers during their transit in and out of the Straits of Hormuz en route to operation "Nimble Archer", involving naval gun bombardment and SEAL Team take over of an abandoned oil rig being used by the Iranian Revolutionary Guard to stage attacks on Persian Gulf shipping. Rentz has been deployed to the Persian Gulf numerous times since 1987.

On 28 November 2009 while the ship was moored in Jebel Ali, United Arab Emirates as part of the USS Nimitz CSG, a crewman was killed while performing repairs to the ship. According to the Navy, a 3rd Class Petty Officer was electrocuted while working in an auxiliary machinery space. In response to the mishap, the Navy ordered the entire fleet to inspect ship electrical enclosures.

In December 2013, Rentz intercepted a small drug smuggling vessel in the United States Fourth Fleet area of responsibility as part of an anti-drug trafficking operation, Operation Martillo. The vessel contained approximately 313 kilograms of Cocaine worth an estimated $10.4 million. This was the fourth successful such intercept, bringing the total amount of cocaine seized by Rentz to approximately 3,000 kilograms.

=== Fate ===
Rentz was sunk as part of the 2016 SINKEX exercise Valiant Shield. The exercise was led by aircraft from Carrier Air Wing Five (CVW 5).

"Live fire from ships and aircraft participating in Valiant Shield 2016 sank the decommissioned USS Rentz (FFG 46) in waters 30,000 feet deep and 117 nautical miles northeast of Guam Sept. 13 . . . The ship sank in five hours after sustaining 22 missile hits, finally succumbing to hellfire missiles shots by the “Golden Falcons” of HSC-12."

=== Awards ===
- "Outstanding food service" in the Pacific Fleet, 1997 Ney Award winner "Small Afloat."
- "Outstanding food service" in the Pacific Fleet, 2000 Ney runner-up "Small Afloat."
- 2003 Mobility Energy Efficiency award from the Federal Emergency Management Agency.

== The Ship's Crest ==
The colors blue and gold are traditionally associated with the U.S. Navy. The vertical trident represents the sea god Neptune. The crossed missiles indicate the type of ship "Frigate with Guided Missiles." The cross on the shield symbolizes the ship's namesake, Chaplain Rentz. The motto "Dread Nought" tells all to have no fear for the ship is watched over by higher powers.
