= Admiral Tidd =

Admiral Tidd may refer to:

- Emmett Hulcy Tidd (1923–2018), U.S. Navy vice admiral
- Kurt W. Tidd (born 1956), U.S. Navy admiral
- Mark L. Tidd (born 1955), U.S. Navy rear admiral
