= Tidd =

Tidd is a surname. Notable people with the surname include:

- Emmett H. Tidd (1923–2018), United States Navy vice admiral
- Kurt W. Tidd (born 1956), United States Navy admiral
- Mark L. Tidd (born 1955), United States Navy rear admiral
- William Tidd (1760–1847), legal writer

== Fictional characters ==
- Leroy Tidd, a character in the television series Oz
