= Chief of Chaplains =

Chief of Chaplains may refer to:

- Chaplain General, a term used in the Anglican Church
- Chaplain General section of Military Chaplain, term used by some militaries for senior chaplain, synonymous with Chief of Chaplains
- Chief of Chaplains of the United States Army
- Chief of Chaplains of the United States Navy
- Chief of Chaplains of the United States Air Force
- Chiefs of Chaplains of the United States
- Current U.S. Military Chiefs of Chaplains (template)

Also:

- Chaplain of the United States Marine Corps, Senior Chaplain in the U.S. Marines, a position filled by the Deputy Chief of Chaplains in the United States Navy
- Chaplain of the Coast Guard, Senior Chaplain in the U.S. Coast Guard, a position filled by a senior U.S. Navy Chaplain at the rank of U.S. Navy Captain
- Armed Forces Chaplains Board, a U.S. military board made up of the three Chiefs of Chaplains and active-duty Deputy Chiefs of Chaplains of the Army, Navy, and Air Force
