= List of United States Coast Guard people =

The following is a list of people who served in the United States Coast Guard and have gained notability through previous or subsequent endeavors, infamy, or successes:

Note: When adding a name to this list, please place the same in alphabetical order and provide a reliable verifiable source. Secondary sources such as fansites are not allowed. As a guide please see: sources. Additions that are not in alphabetical order and/or do not provide a primary reliable verifiable source will be removed.

== A ==
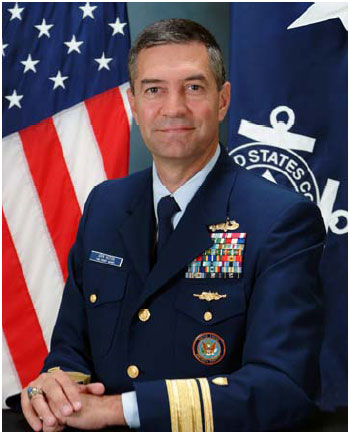
John C. Acton

- John C. Acton – retired rear admiral who serves as the Director of Operations Coordination for DHS. Acton formerly served as Director of the DHS Presidential Transition Team.
- Derroll Adams – folk musician
- Nick Adams – actor (served 1952–1955)
- Eddie Albert – actor and activist
- Thad Allen – former commandant, incident commander for Deep Water Horizon oil spill and Hurricane Katrina disaster recovery operations.
- Gerald Arpino – choreographer

== B ==
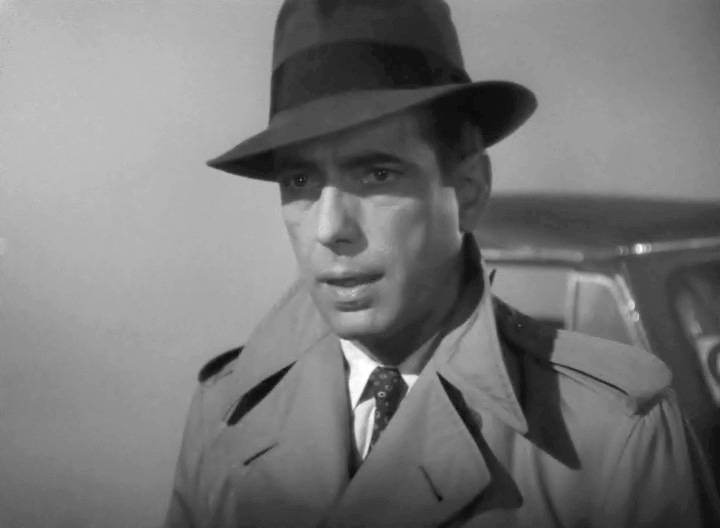
Humphrey Bogart

- Al Barlick – professional baseball umpire, National Baseball Hall of Fame inductee (served during World War II)
- Edward T. Barry – American professional hockey player
- Panayiota Bertzikis – executive director, Military Rape Crisis Center
- Tom Blake – surfer and inventor
- Humphrey Bogart – actor (Bogart volunteered his yacht Santana (as well as himself) in 1944 for service with the Coast Guard Temporary Reserve)
- Corey Brandt – baseball executive and former baseball general manager (served 1996-2000)
- Milton H. Bren – producer (Tars and Spars), writer, director
- Beau Bridges – actor (served from 1959 to 1967 in the Coast Guard Reserve)
- Jeff Bridges – actor (served from 1967 to 1975 in the Coast Guard Reserve)
- Lloyd Bridges – actor (he was a member of Coast Guard and Coast Guard Auxiliary and did a number of public service announcements for the Coast Guard)
- Frank Brimsek – professional hockey player, National Hockey Hall of Fame inductee (Served from 1943 to 1945)
- Aaron Brown – broadcast journalist, professor of journalism at Arizona State
- Danny Joe Brown – lead singer for the southern rock group Molly Hatchet
- Erroll M. Brown – the first Coast Guard African-American admiral
- Nathan Bruckenthal – the only Coast Guardsman killed in action in Iraq, and the first KIA since the Vietnam War
- Daniel C. Burbank – second Coast Guard astronaut, Captain, USCG

== C ==
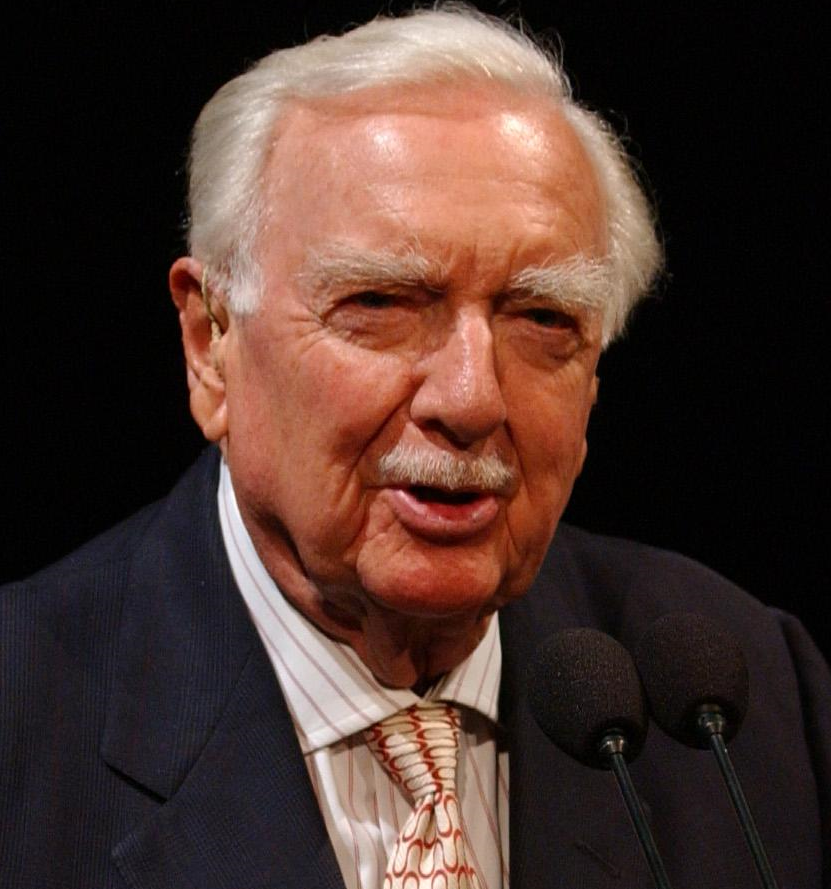
Walter Cronkite

- Sid Caesar – comedian
- Richard R. Callahan – Coast Guard Medal recipient
- Gil Carmichael – Mississippi businessman, transportation specialist and politician
- Lou Carnesecca – college basketball coach
- Gower Champion – dancer, actor, director
- Howard Coble – congressman (North Carolina), retired Coast Guard Reserve captain
- Edwin Louis Cole – author, pastor
- Chris Cooper – actor
- Art Coulter – professional hockey player, National Hockey Hall of Fame inductee
- Warren Covington – musician and band leader (took over the Tommy Dorsey Orchestra)
- Richard Cromwell – actor
- Walter Cronkite – newscaster, member of the United States Coast Guard Auxiliary and an honorary commodore

== D ==
- Valentine Davies – Oscar-winning screenwriter and director (Miracle on 34th Street, The Glenn Miller Story)
- Jim Davis – actor
- William D. Delahunt – congressman (Massachusetts)
- Jack Dempsey – professional boxer
- Andre Douglas – NASA astronaut
- Vernon Duke – composer

== E ==
- Buddy Ebsen – actor
- Blake Edwards – writer, director, producer
- Perry Ellis – fashion designer
- Edwin D. Eshleman – former U.S. Congressman, Pennsylvania

== F ==
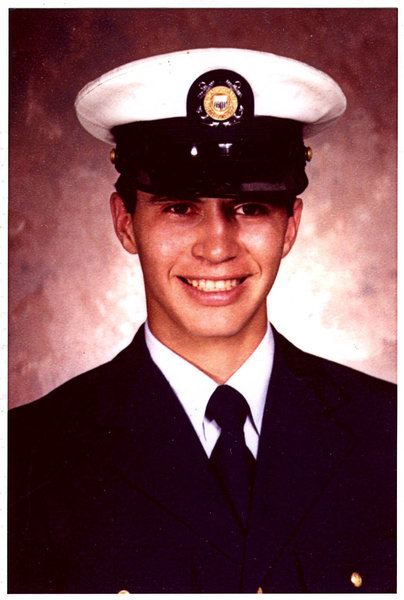
William R. Flores

"Man in Rigging" painting by Anton Otto Fischer

- William R. "Willie" Flores – Coast Guard Medal recipient, namesake of the Sentinel-class cutter USCGC William Flores
- Arthur Fiedler – conductor, Boston Pops Orchestra
- Anton Otto Fischer – artist
- Glenn Ford – actor
- Preston Foster – actor
- William A. Fraker – Oscar-nominated cinematographer
- Elizebeth Smith Friedman – cryptanalyst for the U.S. Treasury Department and the Coast Guard

== G ==
- Neal Gay – professional Rodeo Hall of Fame inductee
- Charles Gibson – newscaster
- Leroy Gilbert – former officer of the U.S. Navy and Chaplain of the United States Coast Guard
- Arthur Godfrey – entertainer
- Gale Gordon – actor
- Sid Gordon, – two-time All-Star Major League Baseball player
- Otto Graham – professional football player and coach
- Burton Gilliam – actor

== H ==
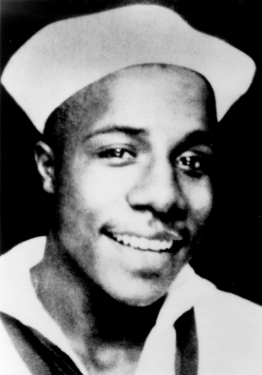
Alex Haley

- Alan Hale, Jr. – actor
- Alex Haley – writer
- Wynn Handman – actor, director
- William O. Harbach – producer
- David Hasselhoff – actor, made an honorary Commodore for his work alongside the USCG Auxiliary in 1997.
- Michael A. Healy – first man of African American descent to command a U.S. Government vessel.
- Jim Hegan – professional baseball player and coach
- Robert Horton – actor
- Tab Hunter – actor

== J ==
- Lew Jenkins – professional boxer and world lightweight champion
- Harvey E. Johnson, Jr. – retired Coast Guard Vice Admiral, Deputy Director of FEMA
- Victor Jory – actor

== K ==
- Robert Kellard – actor
- Michael Kilian – author, writer (USCG auxiliarist)
- Jack Kramer – tennis professional

== L ==
- Al Lamberti – Sheriff of Broward County
- Charles Lane – actor
- Jacob Lawrence – artist
- Admiral James Loy – 21st Commandant, 2nd Administrator of the Transportation Security Administration, 2nd United States Deputy Secretary of Homeland Security

== M ==
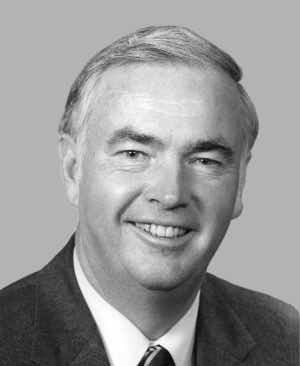
Frank Murkowski

- Guy Madison – actor
- John Mariucci – professional hockey player, National Hockey Hall of Fame inductee
- Monte Markham – actor, producer
- Victor Mature – actor (served in World War II)
- Bruce E. Melnick – NASA astronaut, first Coast Guard astronaut
- G. William Miller – businessman, Secretary of the Treasury
- Bubba Morton – baseball player
- Douglas Munro – the only Coast Guardsman to receive the Medal of Honor
- Frank Murkowski – governor of Alaska and former Alaska senator

== N ==
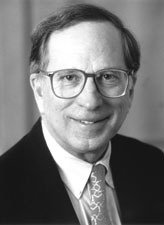
Sam Nunn

- Vice Admiral Peter V. Neffenger – Vice Commandant of the USCG, 6th Administrator of the Transportation Security Administration
- Frank Newcomb – commodore, USCG and Congressional Gold Medal recipient
- Sam Nunn – former Georgia senator

== O ==
- Edwin O'Connor – Pulitzer Prize-winning author
- Thomas F. O'Neil – executive
- Jess Oppenheimer – writer, director, producer of I Love Lucy television show

== P ==
- Arnold Palmer – professional golfer
- Ed Parker – founder of American Kenpo Karate
- George S. Patton, Jr. – awarded the Silver Lifesaving Medal for saving three boys from drowning
- Vincent W. Patton III – first African American to become Master Chief Petty Officer of the Coast Guard
- Vice Admiral David P. Pekoske – 26th Vice Comandant and 7th Administrator of the Transportation Security Administration
- Claiborne Pell – former Rhode Island senator
- J.D. Power III – businessman (served from 1953 to 1957)
- Ronald C. Prei – Coast Guard Medal recipient

== Q ==
- Richard Quine – actor

== R ==
- Al Roker – television personality, Honorary Commodore, Coast Guard Auxiliary
- Cesar Romero – actor

== S ==
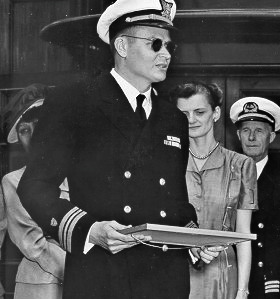
Carlton Skinner

- Walter Sande – actor
- Steve Shagan – Oscar-nominated screenwriter, film and television producer, and novelist
- Charles S. Shapiro – former U.S. Ambassador to Venezuela
- Joe Simon – comic book writer, artist, editor and publisher
- Carlton Skinner – first civilian governor of Guam
- Ron Sparks – Alabama politician
- Ted Steele – radio personality
- Dorothy C. Stratton – first director of the SPARS

== T ==
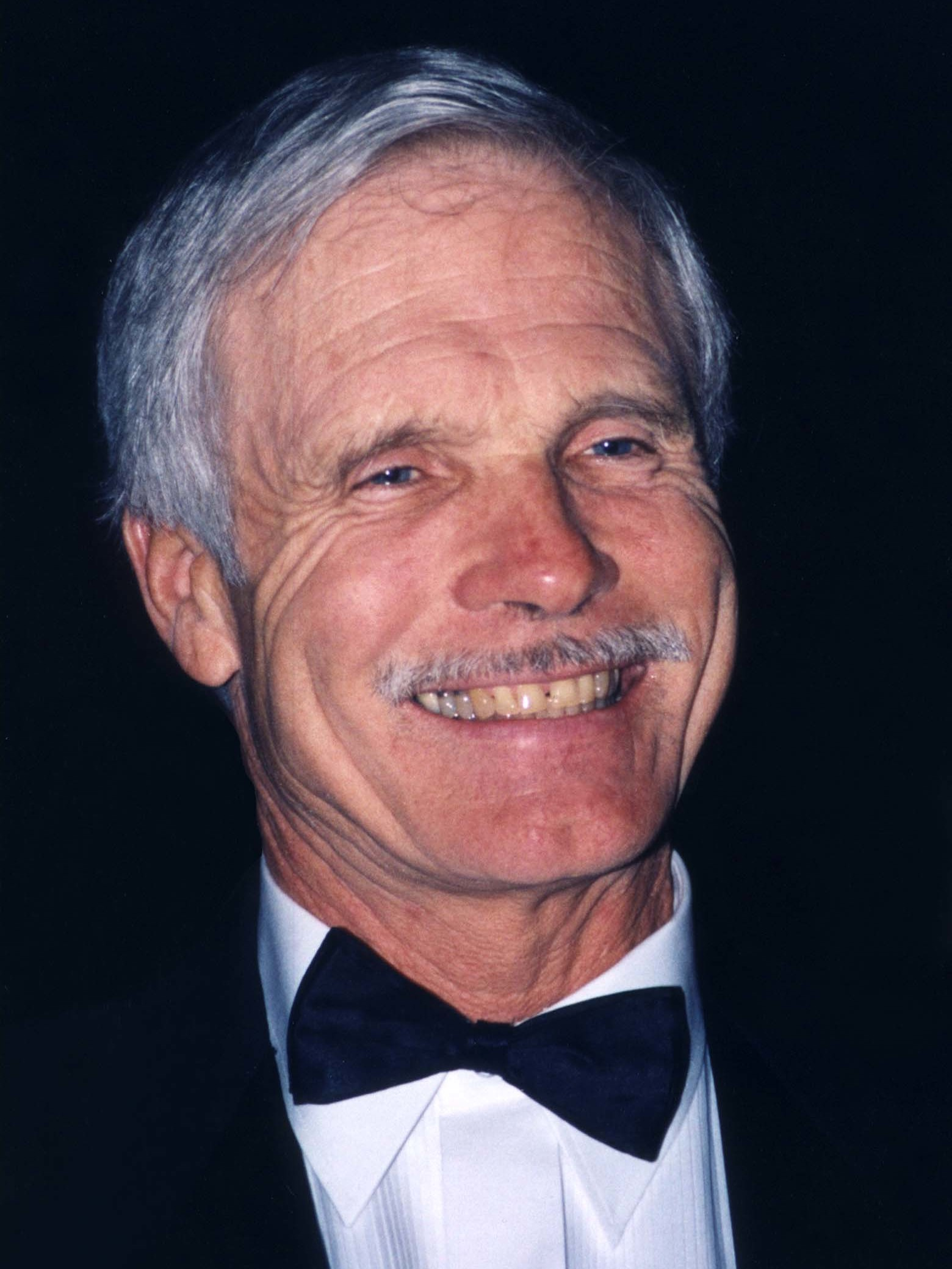
Ted Turner

- Gene Taylor – congressman (Mississippi)
- Emlen Tunnell – professional football player
- Ted Turner – businessman

== V ==
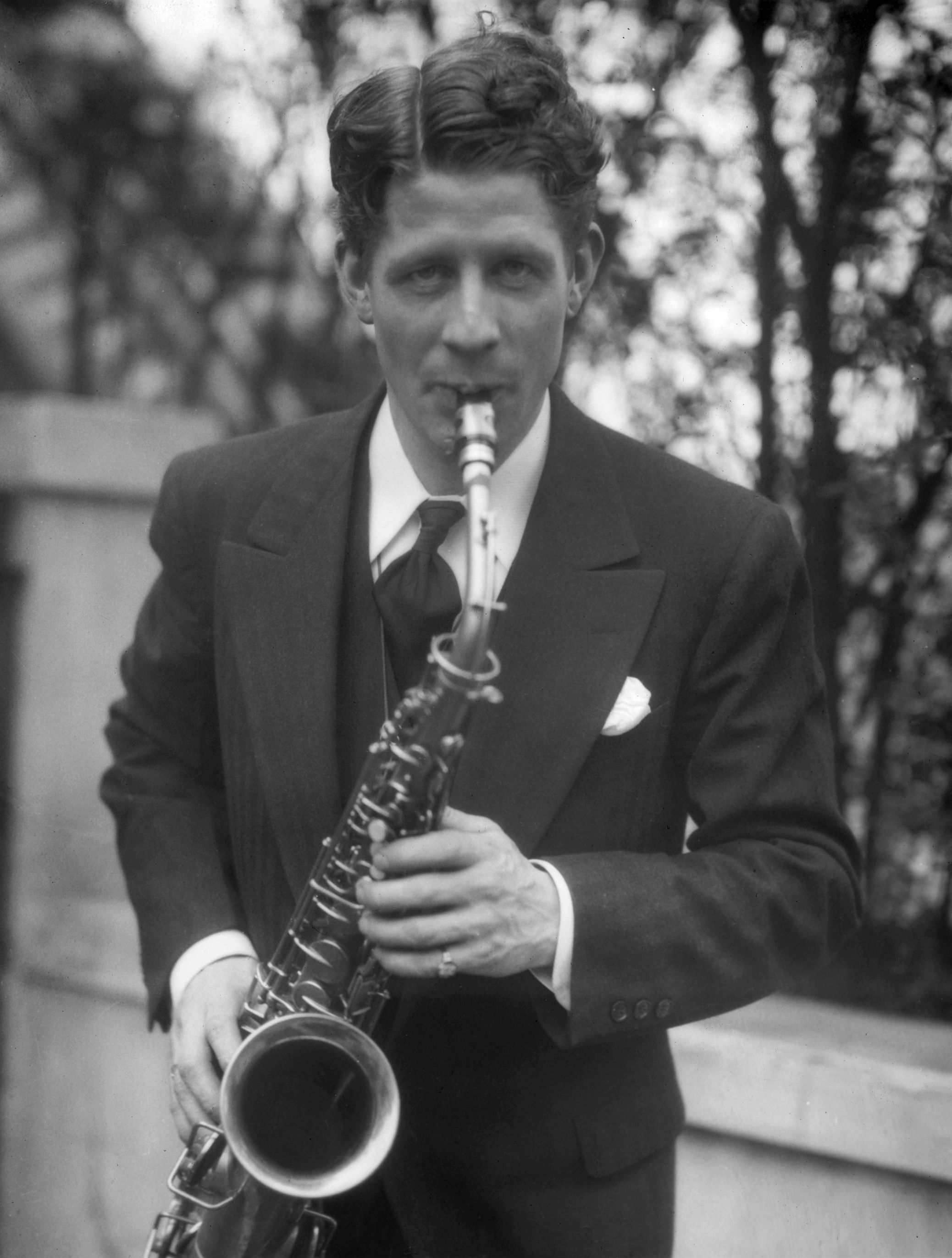
Rudy Vallee

- Rudy Vallée – entertainer, musician, singer

== W ==
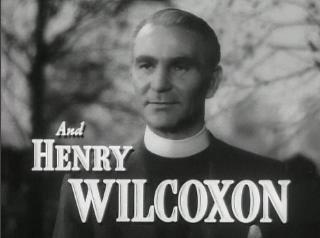
Henry Wilcoxon

- Tom Waits – actor, singer, songwriter
- Patrick Wayne – actor
- Bernard C. Webber – Gold Lifesaving Medal awardee, author
- Henry Wilcoxon – actor
- Don "The Dragon" Wilson – martial arts master, actor
- Sloan Wilson – writer
- Kai Winding – musician
- Lothar Wolff – producer, director

== Y ==
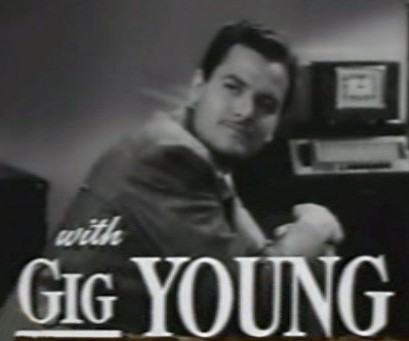
Gig Young

- Gig Young – actor

== Z ==
- Paul F. Zukunft – retired commandant and admiral

== Sources ==
U.S. Coast Guard Historian's Office
