= Brent Scott =

Brent Scott can mean:

- Brent Scott (basketball), retired American professional basketball player
- Brent W. Scott, retired United States Navy rear admiral and chaplain
- Brent Scott, also known as PD, founder of the pornographic website Insex
