= Admiral Baker =

Admiral Baker may refer to:

- Alan T. Baker (born 1956), U.S. Navy rear admiral
- Sir Henry Baker, 2nd Baronet (1787–1859), British Royal Navy vice admiral
- John Baker (Royal Navy officer) (1660–1716), British Royal Navy vice admiral
- Stuart P. Baker (fl. 1980s–2020s), U.S. Navy rear admiral
- Thomas Baker (Royal Navy officer) (1771–1845), British Royal Navy vice admiral
- Wilder D. Baker (1890–1975), U.S. Navy vice admiral
