= Joseph R. Lamonde =

U.S. Navy chaplain (1948–2021)

The Reverend Monsignor Joseph R. Lamonde
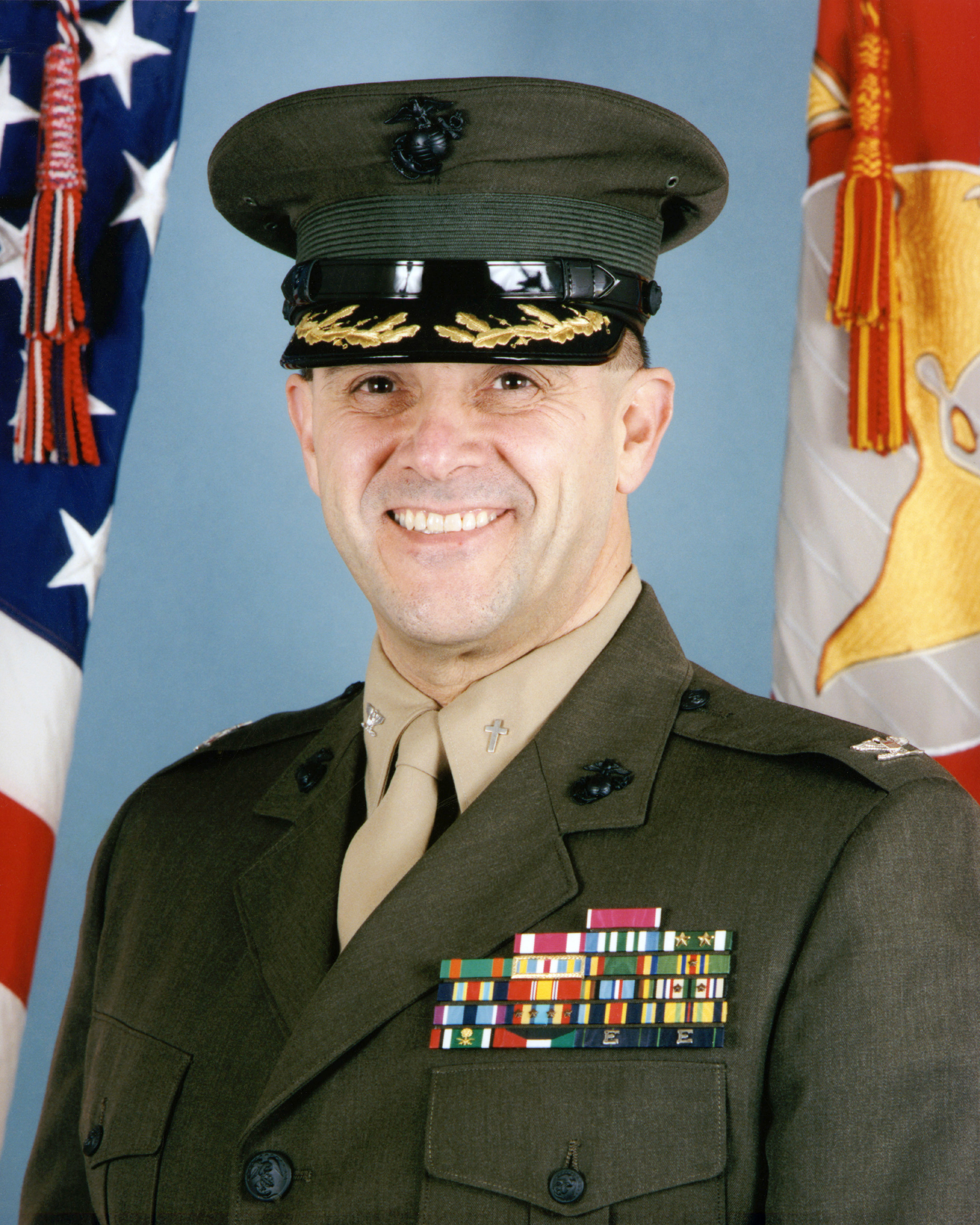
- Official portrait, 1999

13th Chaplain of the Marine Corps
- In office April 1, 1998 – August 2000
- Preceded by: George W. Pucciarelli
- Succeeded by: Louis V. Iasiello

Personal details
- Born: Joseph Richard Lamonde; June 22, 1948 Pittsburgh, Pennsylvania, United States
- Died: November 18, 2021 (aged 73)
- Resting place: National Cemetery of the Alleghenies
- Education: Saint Francis College (BA, MDiv)

Military service
- Branch/service: United States Navy
- Years of service: 1978‍–‍2000
- Rank: Captain
- Battles/wars: Gulf War
- Awards: Legion of Merit; Meritorious Service Medal
- Church: Catholic (Latin Church)

Orders
- Ordination: May 4, 1974 (priesthood) by Vincent Leonard

Joseph Richard Lamonde (June 22, 1948 – November 18, 2021) was a Chaplain of the United States Marine Corps who served from 1978 in a number of posts, including as Chaplain of the United States Marine Corps Forces, Pacific from 1998 to 2000. He was awarded several times for his service, those awards include the Legion of Merit with two award stars, the Meritorious Service Medal with two award stars, the Joint Service Commendation Medal, the Navy and Marine Corps Commendation Medal with two award stars and the Navy and Marine Corps Achievement Medal.

== Biography ==
A native of Pittsburgh, Pennsylvania, Lamonde was ordained a Roman Catholic priest by Bishop Vincent Leonard on May 4, 1974. He received his B.A. degree from Saint Francis College and his M.Div. degree from the Saint Francis School of Theology in Loretto, Pennsylvania. Lamonde was named an Honorary Prelate with the title of Reverend Monsignor by Pope John Paul II.

Lamonde died on November 18, 2021, at the age of 73, after suffering from cancer.

== Career ==
Lamonde joined the United States Navy Chaplain Corps in 1978. Early assignments included being stationed at Marine Corps Air Station Iwakuni, Naval Hospital Philadelphia, Camp Hansen and aboard the USS Nicholson (DD-982).

During the Gulf War, Lamonde served aboard the USS Saratoga (CV-60). Following the war, he was stationed at Guantanamo Bay Naval Base before being named Chaplain of the United States Marine Corps Forces, Pacific. He held the position of Chaplain of the United States Marine Corps from 1998 to 2000.

Awards he has received include the Legion of Merit with two award stars, the Meritorious Service Medal with two award stars, the Joint Service Commendation Medal, the Navy and Marine Corps Commendation Medal with two award stars and the Navy and Marine Corps Achievement Medal.
