= Margaret Kibben =

American chaplain (born 1960)

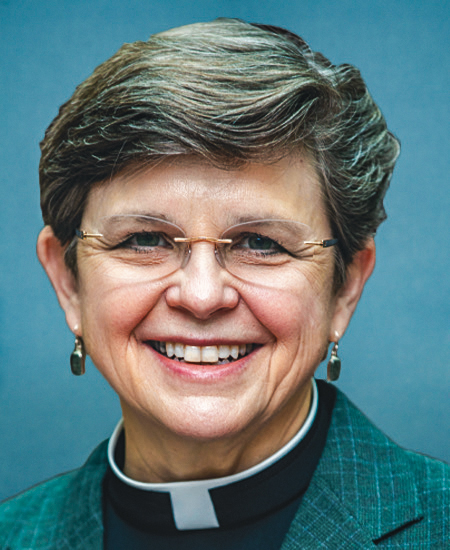

Chaplain of the United States House of Representatives
- Incumbent
- Assumed office January 3, 2021; Acting: January 3, 2025 – present
- Preceded by: Pat Conroy

26th Chief of Chaplains of the United States Navy
- In office August 2, 2014 – July 22, 2018
- Preceded by: Mark L. Tidd
- Succeeded by: Brent W. Scott

18th Chaplain of the United States Marine Corps
- In office May 14, 2010 – July 24, 2014
- Preceded by: Mark L. Tidd
- Succeeded by: Brent W. Scott

Personal details
- Born: Margaret Ellen Grun; 1960 (age 65–66) Warrington, Pennsylvania, U.S.
- Education: Goucher College (BA); Princeton Theological Seminary (MDiv, DMin); Naval War College (MA)

Military service
- Allegiance: United States
- Branch/service: United States Navy
- Years of service: 1986–2018
- Rank: Rear Admiral
- Awards: Navy Distinguished Service Medal; Legion of Merit (2); Bronze Star; Meritorious Service Medal (3)

Margaret Ellen Grun Kibben (née Grun; born 1960) is an American Presbyterian minister who is the acting chaplain of the United States House of Representatives. Speaker Mike Johnson appointed Kibben as acting House chaplain on January 3, 2025. Johnson also stated his intent to replace Kibben in the coming weeks, but ultimately did not.

She also served as the 26th Chief of Chaplains of the United States Navy from 2014 to 2018; she was formerly the 18th Chaplain of the United States Marine Corps (CHMC) and the Deputy Chief of Chaplains of the United States Navy from 2010 to 2014. Kibben was the first woman to hold each of these positions.

== Early life and education ==
A native of Warrington, Pennsylvania, Kibben entered active duty in the U.S. Navy in 1986. She earned a B.A. degree from Goucher College in Towson, Maryland in 1982. Kibben received both her Masters of Divinity (1986) and her Doctor of Ministry (2002) degrees from Princeton Theological Seminary, Princeton, New Jersey. She also earned an M.A. degree in National Security and Strategic Studies from the Naval War College in 1996. Kibben was a senior fellow at the United States Institute of Peace.

== Military career ==
Kibben's Marine Corps assignments have included Marine Corps Base Quantico where she served with Headquarters and Service Battalion, Security Battalion, the Brig, Marine Corps Air Facility and the president's Helicopter Squadron, HMX-1. She also served with the Marines of Second Force Service Support Group Camp Lejeune, N.C., making deployments to both Turkey and Norway. Later she was assigned to the Marine Corps Combat Development Command in Quantico as the doctrine writer for Religious Ministry.

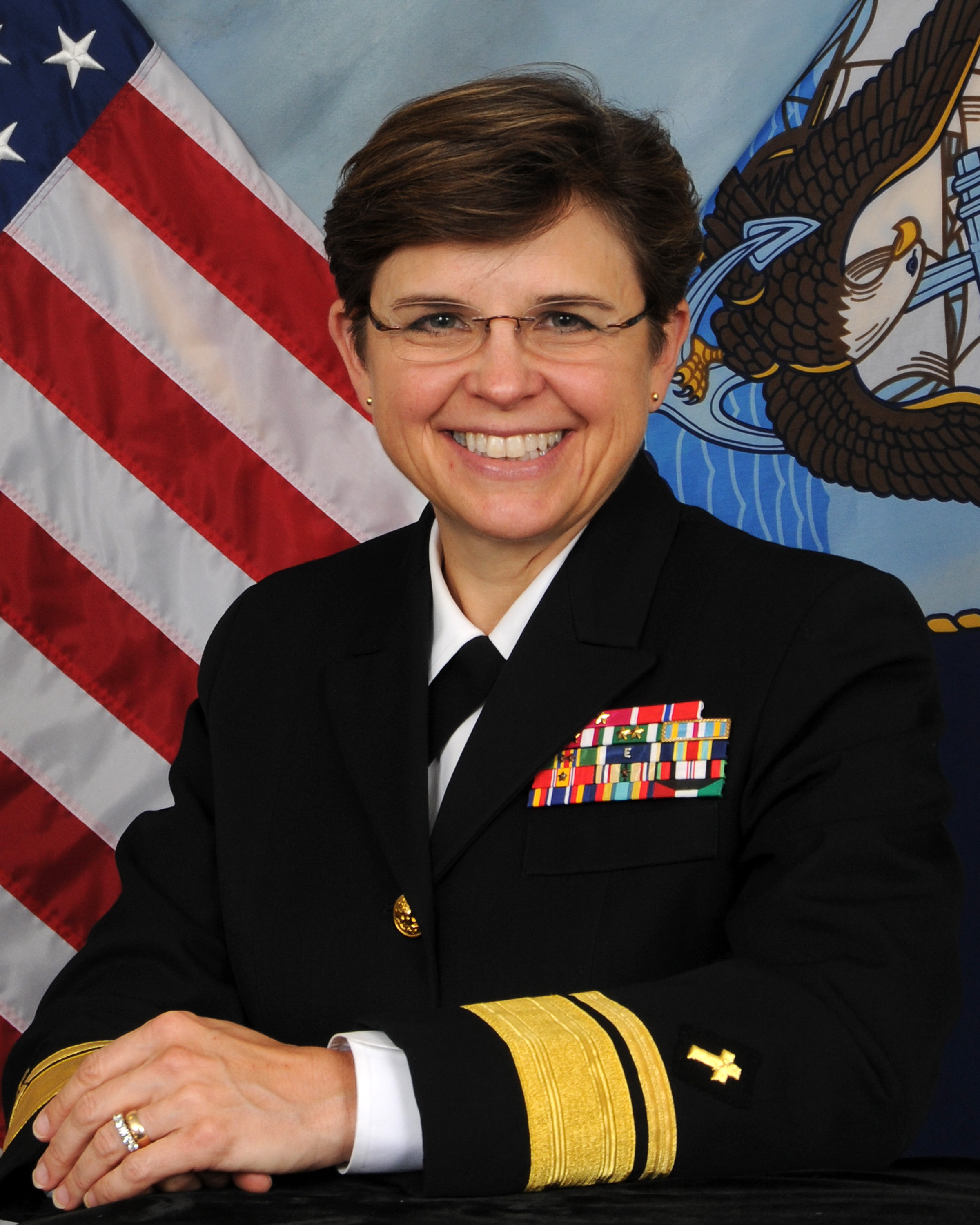
26th Chief of Navy Chaplains

Kibben's Navy assignments include the U.S. Naval Academy in Annapolis, Maryland as the first female chaplain. She was the Navy Chaplain Corps historian at the Chaplain Resource Board and the command chaplain, USS San Diego (AFS-6), in Norfolk, Virginia. As U.S. 3rd Fleet chaplain, Kibben was responsible for the training and certification of all carrier strike group and expeditionary strike group religious ministry teams. She completed a deployment as the command chaplain, Combined Forces Command Afghanistan as an individual augmentee.

Kibben was detailed to the Office of the Chief of Navy Chaplains, first serving as the director for Force Structure and Community Management and then as the executive assistant to the chief of Navy Chaplains.

Kibben was the 18th Chaplain of the United States Marine Corps (CHMC) and the Chief of Chaplains of the United States Navy. She was the first woman to hold this office.

The Chief of Navy Chaplains is the Senior Chaplain in the Navy, the Head of the U.S. Navy Chaplain Corps, and the Director of Religious Ministry Support for the Department of the Navy. He or she advises the Secretary of the Navy, the Commandant of the Marine Corps, the Chief of Naval Operations, and the Commandant of the Coast Guard "on all matters pertaining to religion within the Navy, United States Marine Corps, and United States Coast Guard."

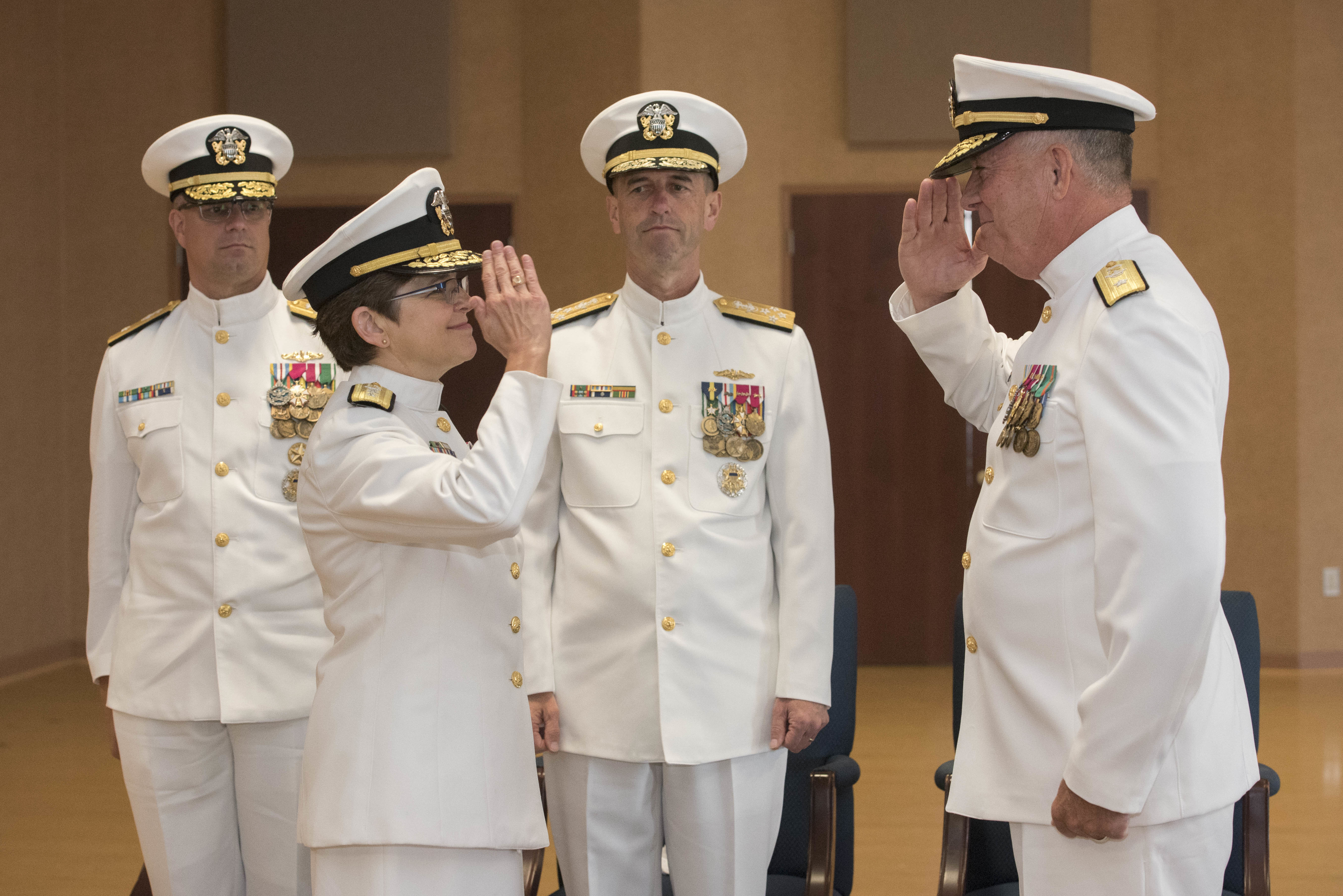
Rear Adm. Kibben was relieved by Rear Adm. Brent Scott in July 2018.

After retirement from the Navy, Kibben became a lecturer in Leadership and Ethics at the School of Engineering of the Catholic University of America.

== Chaplain of the House of Representatives ==
On December 31, 2020, House Speaker Nancy Pelosi appointed Kibben as the next House chaplain, making her the first woman to serve as chaplain in either chamber of Congress. Her third day as House chaplain was marked by both the 2021 United States Electoral College vote count and the accompanying violent protests, during which she offered prayers upon the evacuation of House members. She was reelected Chaplain of the United States House of Representatives on January 7, 2023, after Kevin McCarthy was elected Speaker.

Speaker Mike Johnson appointed Kibben as acting House chaplain on January 3, 2025, for the 119th Congress. Despite her previously holding the office for two terms, Johnson stated that he would replace Kibben.

== Awards and decorations ==

| 1st row | Navy Distinguished Service Medal | Legion of Merit with one gold award star | Bronze Star |
| 2nd row | Meritorious Service Medal with two award stars | Navy and Marine Corps Commendation Medal with two award stars | Joint Meritorious Unit Award |
| 3rd row | Navy Meritorious Unit Commendation with two bronze service stars | Navy "E" Ribbon | Fleet Marine Force Ribbon |
| 4th row | National Defense Service Medal with service star | Southwest Asia Service Medal with service star | Afghanistan Campaign Medal with service star |
| 5th row | Global War on Terrorism Service Medal | Navy Sea Service Deployment Ribbon | Kuwaiti Kuwait Liberation |

== Personal life ==
Kibben is the daughter of William Allen Grun and Jean Marie "Micki" (McFall) Grun. She has one sister. Her father served in the Naval Reserve during World War II, retiring from service as a lieutenant commander.

Kibben is married to Timothy J. Kibben, a retired U.S. Marine Corps lieutenant colonel. The couple have a daughter.

== See also ==
- Armed Forces Chaplains Board

Military offices
| Preceded by Mark L. Tidd | Chaplain of the United States Marine Corps; 2010–2014 | Succeeded by Brent W. Scott |
| Preceded by Mark L. Tidd | Deputy Chief of Chaplains of the United States Navy; 2010–2014 | Succeeded by Brent W. Scott |
| Preceded by Mark L. Tidd | Chief of Chaplains of the United States Navy; 2014–2018 | Succeeded by Brent W. Scott |
Religious titles
| Preceded by Pat Conroy | Chaplain of the United States House of Representatives; 2021–present | Incumbent |
