= Chaplain of the United States Marine Corps =

Position in the US Navy

- Incumbent; RDML Robert Christian since July 17, 2026
- Website: Official website

The chaplain of the United States Marine Corps is a position always filled by the officer serving as Deputy Chief of Chaplains of the United States Navy as a "dual hatted" billet since 2000. This officer oversees religious ministry in the Marine Corps which one commandant of the Marine Corps defined as "a vital function which enhances the personal, family, and community readiness of our Marines, sailors, and their families. Chaplaincy supports the foundational principle of free exercise of religion and helps to enrich the spiritual, moral and ethical fabric of the military."

== Assignment and responsibilities ==
The chief of chaplains of the U.S. Navy advises the commandant of the Marine Corps, the chief of naval operations, and the commandant of the Coast Guard "on all matters pertaining to religion within the Navy, United States Marine Corps, and United States Coast Guard"—but the deputy chief of chaplains serves as chaplain of the Marine Corps, "advising the CMC on religious ministry matters in reference to support, personnel, plans, programs, policies, and facilities within the USMC." Additionally, in the concurrent role of Navy Deputy Chief of Chaplains, the person holding this position is "Deputy Director of Religious Ministries," serving as the "principal assistant to the Chief of Chaplains."

Prior to 2000, when Rear Admiral Louis Iasiello became the first chaplain of flag rank to serve as Chaplain of the Marine Corps, that position was held by a senior Navy chaplain holding the rank of Navy Captain.

== Marine Corps chaplain support ==
Navy chaplains support personnel throughout the Department of the Navy, which includes the Navy and Marine Corps, and also support personnel in the United States Coast Guard.

== Uniforms ==
See: Uniforms of the United States Navy § Navy personnel attached to Marine Corps units

According to Chapter Six of the U.S. military uniform regulations, personnel assigned to the Marine Corps (including chaplains) have the option of wearing Marine Corps uniforms (and chaplains assigned to the Coast Guard may wear Coast Guard uniforms).

== Chaplains of the U.S. Marine Corps (1969–present) ==
	Name	Photo	Term began	Term ended
1.	CAPT Daniel Francis Meehan		1959	1962
2.	CAPT Orlando Ingvoldstad, Jr.		1962	1964
3.	CAPT Loren M. Lindquist		1964	1968
4.	CAPT John H. Craven		1969	1973
5.	CAPT Samuel Sobel		1973	1975
6.	CAPT Leo J McDonald		1975	1979
7.	CAPT George W. Evans, Jr.		1979	1982
8.	CAPT Eli Takesian		1982	1986
9.	CAPT Walter A. Hiskett		1985	1989
10.	CAPT Donald L. Krabbe		1989	1991
11.	CAPT Larry H. Ellis		1991	April 1995
12.	CAPT George W. Pucciarelli		April 1995	March 31, 1998
13.	CAPT Joseph R. Lamonde		April 1, 1998	August 2000
14.	RDML Louis V. Iasiello		August 2000	July, 2003
15.	RDML Robert F. Burt		July, 2003	June 22, 2006
16.	RDML Alan T. Baker		June 23, 2006	2009
17.	RDML Mark L. Tidd		August, 2009	May 13, 2010
18.	RDML Margaret G. Kibben		May 14, 2010	July 24, 2014
19.	RDML Brent W. Scott		July 25, 2014	June 20, 2018
20.	RDML Gregory N. Todd		June 21, 2018	May 16, 2022
21.	RDML Carey H. Cash		May 17, 2022	July 2026
22.	RDML Robert R. Christian		July 17, 2026	Incumbent

== Prayers ==
See: Marine Prayer

== See also ==
- Chief of Chaplains of the United States Navy
- Chaplain of the Coast Guard
- Chiefs of Chaplains of the United States
- International Military Chiefs of Chaplains Conference
- Military chaplain
- United States Army Chaplain Corps
- United States Air Force Chaplain Corps
- Chaplain's Medal for Heroism
