= Gregory N. Todd =

U.S. Navy chaplain

The Reverend Gregory N. Todd
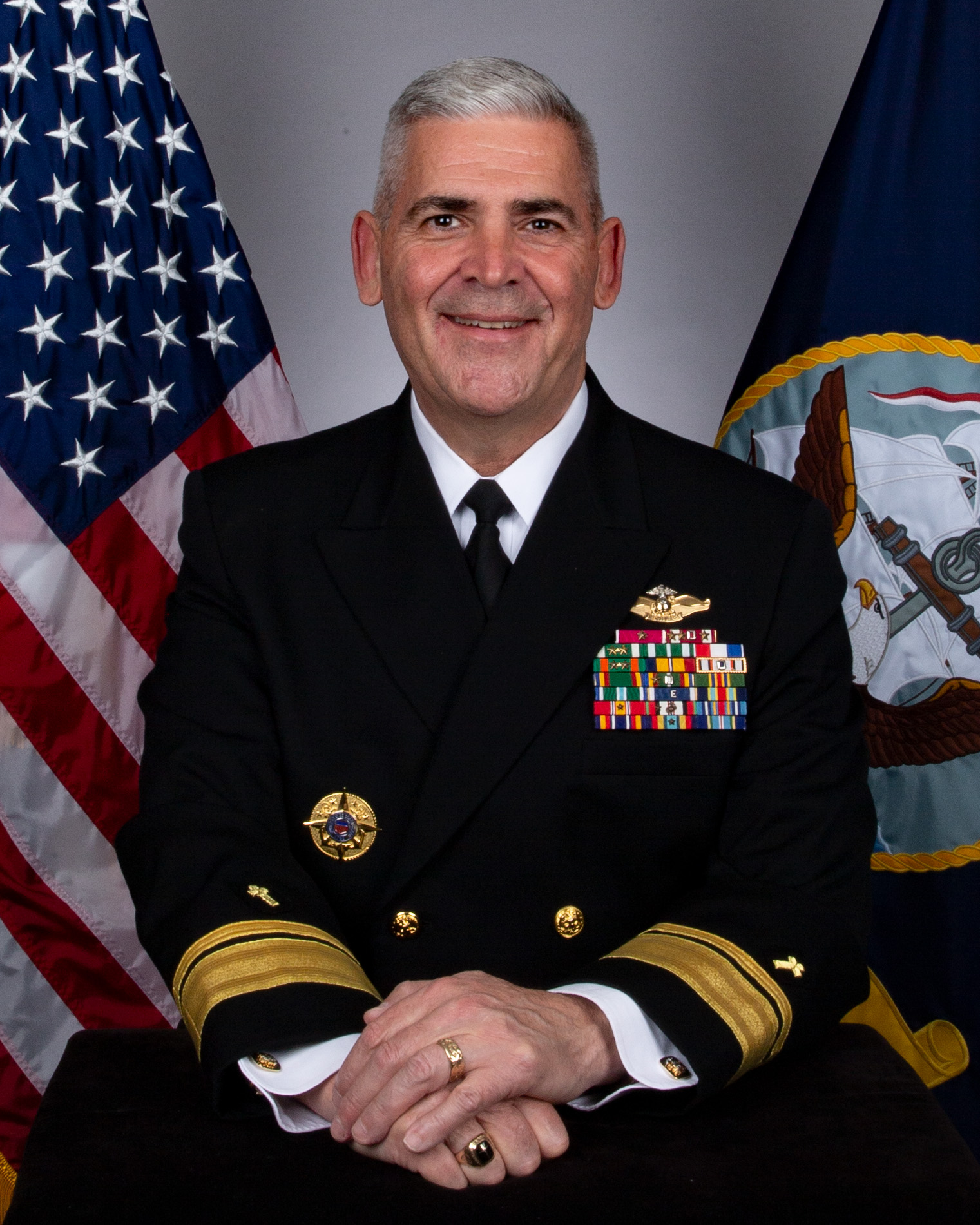
- Born: August 20, 1961 (age 65); Seattle, Washington, U.S.
- Education: Concordia College (BA); Concordia Seminary (MDiv); Gordon-Conwell Theological Seminary (DMin)
- Military career
- Allegiance: United States of America
- Branch: United States Navy
- Service years: 1986–2026
- Rank: Rear Admiral
- Commands: Chief of Chaplains of the United States Navy; Chaplain of the Marine Corps; Chaplain of the United States Coast Guard
- Awards: Legion of Merit (3)

Ecclesiastical career
- Religion: Lutheran
- Church: Lutheran Church – Missouri Synod
- Ordained: 1988

Gregory N. Todd (born August 20, 1961) is a retired United States Navy rear admiral and chaplain who served as the 28th Chief of Chaplains of the United States Navy. He previously served as the 20th Chaplain of the Marine Corps. He also served for four years as the tenth Chaplain of the Coast Guard. Over a thirty-two year career, he has served in a variety of Navy, Marine Corps, and Coast Guard assignments, including deployments to Iraq and Afghanistan and chaplaincy work at Ground Zero in the wake of the September 11 attacks. He is ordained in the Lutheran Church – Missouri Synod.

== Education ==
A Seattle, Washington native, Todd earned a bachelor of arts degree in theology and education from Concordia College in Portland, Oregon, in 1984. He received a Master of Divinity degree from Concordia Seminary in St. Louis, Missouri, and was ordained as a minister in the Lutheran Church – Missouri Synod in 1988. Chaplain Todd later earned a Doctor of Ministry degree in Christian Leadership from the Gordon–Conwell Theological Seminary in Charlotte, North Carolina, in 2009. In 2023, Todd received the Doctor of Divinity (honoris causa) from Concordia Seminary, St. Louis.

== Career ==
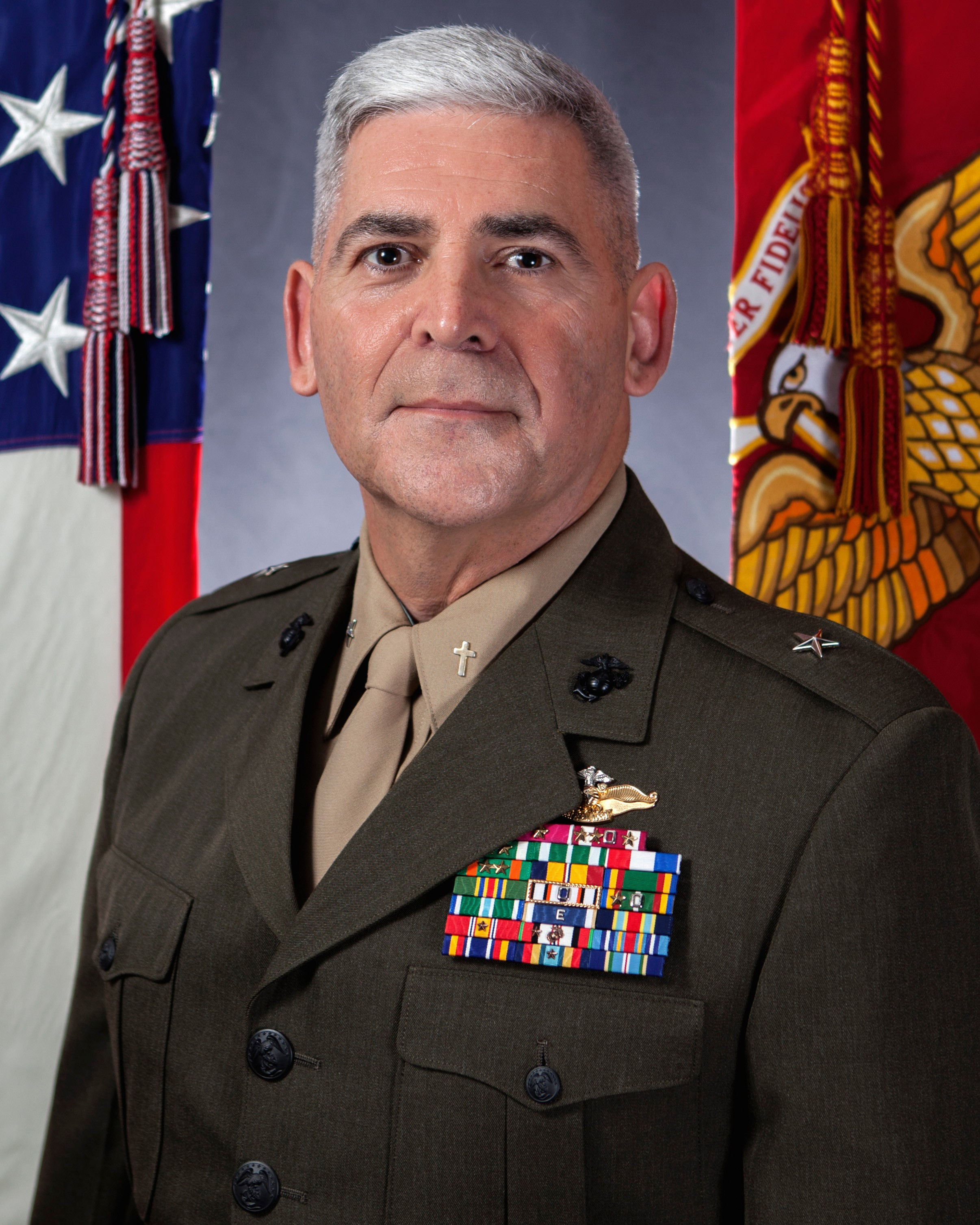
Rear Admiral Gregory N. Todd as 20th Chaplain of the United States Marine Corps

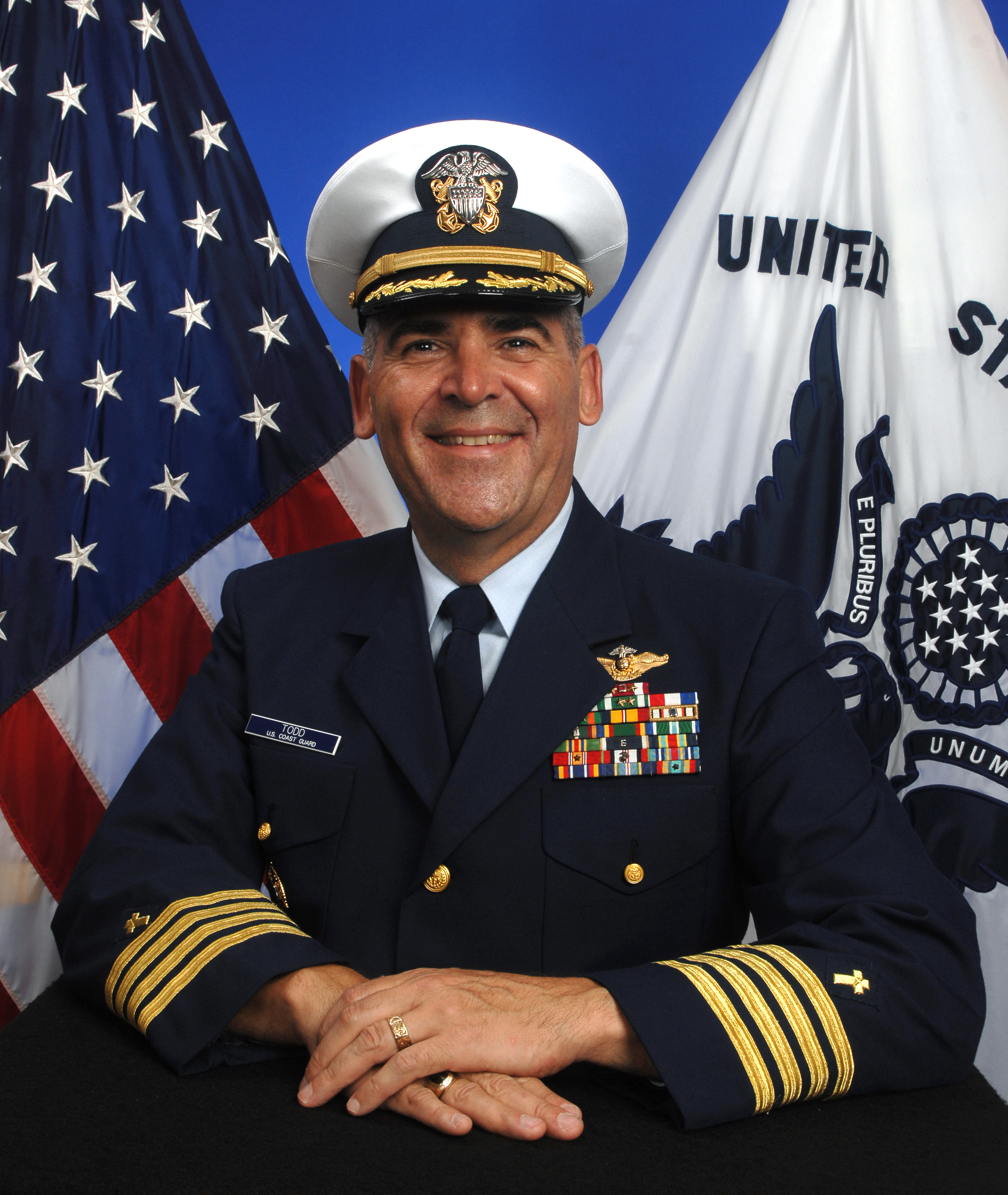
Captain Gregory N. Todd as 10th Chaplain of the United States Coast Guard

Todd was commissioned as an ensign in the United States Navy Reserve in 1986, providing ministry to Marine Corps Reserve units while concurrently serving as pastor for civilian churches in Illinois. He transferred to active duty in 1994 and served as Protestant chaplain at Naval Amphibious Base Coronado, California. From 1996 to 1998, Todd was chaplain aboard the Ticonderoga-class guided missile cruiser USS Chancellorsville.

Todd served his first tour with the Coast Guard from 1998 to 2002, serving as chaplain at Coast Guard Activities New York. While there, he was the first Navy chaplain to arrive at the World Trade Center site after the September 11 attacks, and hosted a Coast Guard Chaplain Emergency Response Team of thirty Navy chaplains working with the Coast Guard, that ministered to civilians and emergency crews at various locations, including Ground Zero, the family center, and One Police Plaza. He was also part of response teams that responded after the crashes of EgyptAir Flight 990 and American Airlines Flight 587.

Todd returned to ministry within the Marine Corps in 2002, reporting to the Second Force Service Support Group based at Camp Lejeune, North Carolina. He deployed to Kuwait with the group's Forward Battalion at a part of Operation Iraqi Freedom. In 2004, he deployed to Afghanistan with the 22nd Marine Expeditionary Unit in support of Operation Enduring Freedom. setting up the ministry at Forward Operating Base Ripley in Afghanistan's Oruzgan Province. In May 2005, he assumed the duties as officer in charge of Marine Corps Chaplain and RP Expeditionary Skills Training (CREST) at Camp Johnson, a post he held until October 2008. He then attended the Senior Supervisory Chaplain Course, after which he reported aboard USS Kearsarge as command chaplain.

Todd returned to the Marine Corps again in July 2010, as chaplain for the 2nd Marine Logistics Group; in this capacity, he led transition and support ministries for Sailors and Marines deploying or redeploying from Afghanistan, and led a chaplain team in Ramstein, Germany supporting Third Location Decompression programs for Explosive Ordnance Disposal Marines, helping to facilitate their transition after a deployment described as "kinetic". In February 2013, he departed 2nd MLG and reported aboard as force chaplain for II Marine Expeditionary Force, leading II MEF's religious program for 50,000-plus Marines, Sailors, and family members.

Todd returned for his second tour with the Coast Guard in June 2014, relieving Captain Gary Weeden as Chaplain of the Coast Guard. He was relieved by Captain Thomas Walcott in April 2018.

At the end of February 2022, Todd was nominated for promotion to two-star rear admiral and appointment as the next Chief of Chaplains of the United States Navy. Todd subsequently succeeded Brent W. Scott as Chief of Chaplains of the United States Navy on 16 March 2022.

In May 2026, RADM Todd retired from the Navy after 32 years of active duty service, during which he received the Navy and Coast Guard Distinguished Service Medals.

== Awards and qualifications ==
Todd's awards include:

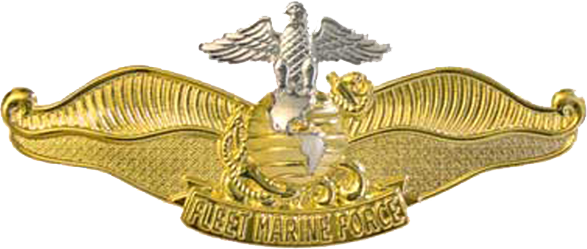

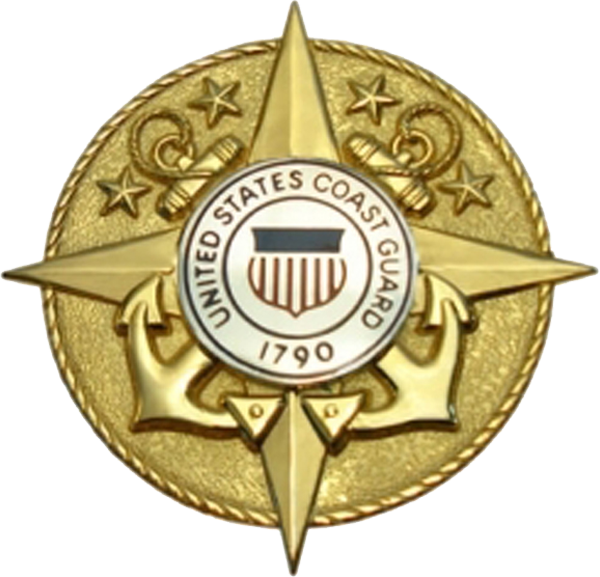

Badge	Fleet Marine Force Insignia (Chaplain)		
1st row	Navy Distinguished Service Medal		
2nd row	Coast Guard Distinguished Service Medal	Legion of Merit with two gold award stars	Meritorious Service Medal with Operational Distinguishing Device and three gold award stars
3rd row	Navy and Marine Corps Commendation Medal with two award stars	Coast Guard Commendation Medal	Transportation 9-11 Medal
4th row	Navy and Marine Corps Achievement Medal with two award stars	Navy Combat Action Ribbon	Secretary of Transportation Outstanding Unit Award with "O" device
5th row	Navy Unit Commendation	Coast Guard Unit Commendation with "O" device and award star	Navy Meritorious Unit Commendation Ribbon
6th row	Coast Guard Meritorious Unit Commendation	Navy "E" Ribbon w/ one Battle E device	Fleet Marine Force Ribbon
7th row	National Defense Service Medal with service star	Afghanistan Campaign Medal with FMF and one bronze campaign star	Global War on Terrorism Expeditionary Medal
8th row	Global War on Terrorism Service Medal	Navy Sea Service Deployment Ribbon with service star	Special Operations Service Ribbon
Badge	Commandant Staff Badge		

- He is also qualified as a Master Training Specialist.

Military offices
Preceded by Gary P. Weeden	Chaplain of the United States Coast Guard; 2014–2018	Succeeded by Thomas J. Walcott
Preceded by Brent W. Scott	Chaplain of the United States Marine Corps and Deputy Chief of Chaplains of the United States Navy; 2018–2022	Succeeded by Carey H. Cash
Preceded by Brent W. Scott	Chief of Chaplains of the United States Navy; 2022–present	Incumbent
