= John C. Acton =

United States Coast Guard rear admiral

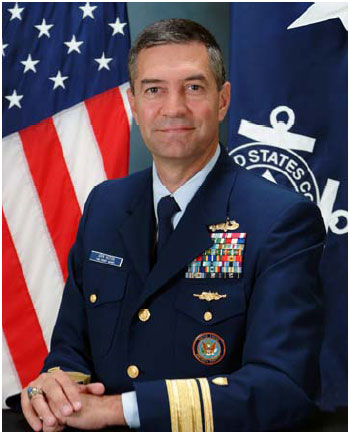
- Born: Portsmouth, Virginia, U.S.
- Military career
- Allegiance: United States of America
- Branch: United States Coast Guard
- Service years: 1972–2008
- Rank: Rear Admiral
- Commands: USCGC Cape Henlopen; Port Security Unit 308; CG Reserve Group MLC Atlantic
- Awards: Coast Guard Distinguished Service Medal; Legion of Merit (Four Awards); Defense Meritorious Service Medal; Joint Service Commendation Medal; Coast Guard Commendation Medal (Two Awards); Transportation 9-11 Medal; Coast Guard Achievement Medal (Two Awards)

John C. Acton is a retired United States Coast Guard rear admiral who served as the Director of Operations Coordination for DHS. Acton formerly served as Director of the DHS Presidential Transition Team.

== Background and education ==
Born in Portsmouth, Virginia, Acton earned a B.A. degree from the U.S. Coast Guard Academy in 1976 and was selected for flag rank in 2003. In addition to his undergraduate degree, Acton holds a Masters of Business Administration (MBA) degree from Columbia University and has also completed post-graduate studies at both Harvard University and Dartmouth College.

== Coast Guard career ==
On active duty, he served aboard USCGC Glacier, homeported in Long Beach, California, as an ice-qualified Deck Watch Officer and CIC Officer during cruises to the Arctic and Antarctica. Next he served as Commanding Officer, USCGC Cape Henlopen, a search and rescue patrol boat in Petersburg, Alaska, and then completed his active duty at Vessel Traffic Service, New Orleans.

In the reserves, Acton developed broad operational, logistic, interagency and joint military expertise as the commanding officer of six reserve units: including a vessel augmentation unit, a search and rescue unit, Port Security Unit 308 in Gulfport, Mississippi; and CG Reserve Unit SOUTHCOM in Miami, Florida. He also served at Marine Safety Office Tampa, Florida.

Acton was recalled to active duty for nearly three years subsequent to the 9/11 terrorist attacks to serve, initially, as a CG Liaison Officer at U.S. Joint Forces Command and then as the CG Liaison Officer for the stand-up of U.S. Northern Command. As the Fifth CG District Chief of Staff, he provided oversight for the largest reserve mobilization since World War II, in support of Operations Noble Eagle and Iraqi Freedom. He finished his active duty on Secretary Ridge's operations integration staff at the Department of Homeland Security.

During the Fall 2005 he was recalled as the senior CG Liaison Officer in support of Hurricanes Katrina and Rita operations along the Gulf Coast. In 2006, he was recalled as the Deputy Director of Operations (DJ3) at U.S. Northern Command in Colorado Springs. His final billet was Deputy Commander, Mobilization and Reserve Affairs, for the Coast Guard Atlantic Area in Portsmouth, Virginia. Acton served as the Director of both the DHS Presidential Transition Team and the Coast Guard Presidential Transition Team.

His active duty for training assignments included overseas evolutions in Turkey, Portugal, Germany and Korea; as well as coursework at the Naval War College, the National Defense University, the Army War College and Harvard University's Kennedy School.

== Decorations ==
Acton’s decorations include the Coast Guard Distinguished Service Medal, four Legions of Merit, the Defense Meritorious Service Medal, the Meritorious Service Medal, the Joint Service Commendation Medal, two CG Commendation Medals, the 9/11 Medal, two CG Achievement Medals, the Arctic and Antarctic Service Medals, as well as other team and unit awards.

- Coast Guard Distinguished Service Medal
- Legion of Merit with three Gold Stars
- Defense Meritorious Service Medal
- Meritorious Service Medal
- Joint Service Commendation Medal
- Coast Guard Commendation Medal with Gold Star
- Transportation 9-11 Medal
- Coast Guard Achievement Medal with Gold star
- Coast Guard Arctic Service Medal
- Antarctica Service Medal

== See also ==
- List of U.S. Coast Guard people
