= Chiefs of Chaplains of the United States =

US Armed Forces chaplain rank

In the United States armed forces, the chiefs of chaplains of the United States are the senior service chaplains who lead and represent the Chaplain Corps of the United States Army, Navy, and Air Force. The Navy created the first Office of the Chief of Chaplains in 1917; the Army followed in 1920, and the Air Force established its own in 1948 after it became a separate branch.

The three chiefs of chaplains and the three active-duty deputy chiefs of chaplains from the Army, Navy, and Air Force comprise the Armed Forces Chaplains Board (AFCB) which provides advice and recommendations to OSD officials (the secretary of defense and the under secretary of defense for personnel and readiness) on policies and issues related to the free exercise of religion and on all matters concerning religion, spiritual readiness, morality, ethics, morale, and military chaplains, in addition to a number of policy issues.

The current military chiefs of chaplains are:

Name	Photo	Rank and service	Chaplain Corps emblem	Position	Appointed
Vacant		Major General; US Army		Chief of Chaplains of the United States Army	since April 2, 2026
Gregory N. Todd		Rear Admiral; US Navy		Chief of Chaplains of the United States Navy	May 16, 2022
Trent C. Davis		Major General; US Air Force		Chief of Chaplains of the United States Air Force	August 9, 2024

== Chaplains of the Marine Corps, Coast Guard, and Space Force ==
As the Marine Corps and Coast Guard do not commission chaplains, the United States Navy deputy chief of chaplains also serves as chaplain of the United States Marine Corps, and a senior Navy chaplain holding the rank of Navy captain serves as chaplain of the Coast Guard. The Air Force chief of chaplains also serves as chaplain for the United States Space Force. The current chaplains are:

Name	Photo	Rank and service	Position	Appointed
Carey H. Cash		Rear Admiral; US Marine Corps	Chaplain of the United States Marine Corps	May 17, 2022
Jennifer D. Bowden		Captain; US Navy	Chaplain of the United States Coast Guard	July 2024
Trent C. Davis		Major General; US Air Force	Chaplain of the United States Space Force	August 9, 2024

== See also ==
- International Military Chiefs of Chaplains Conference
- Chaplain General
- Armed Forces Chaplaincy Center
- Religious symbolism in the United States military
