= Thomas K. Chadwick =

Chaplain of the United States Coast Guard

- Born: May 27, 1949 (age 77); Xenia, Ohio
- Military career
- Branch: United States Navy
- Service years: 1971–1998
- Rank: Captain
- Awards: Legion of Merit

Thomas Keith Chadwick is retired officer in the United States Navy and former Chaplain of the United States Coast Guard.

== Career ==
Chadwick was commissioned a Navy chaplain candidate in 1971 and entered active duty in 1975. He would serve aboard the USS Harry E. Yarnell (CG-17), as well as with Fleet Marine Force and the U.S. Atlantic Fleet. His promotion to Captain was approved in 1991. Chadwick held the position of Chaplain of the United States Coast Guard from 1992 to 1995 before retiring in 1998.

From 1998 until 2017, Chadwick served as the national endorsing agent for US military chaplains, as director of the Presbyterian Council for Military Chaplain for the Presbyterian Church, USA, and several other smaller Presbyterian denominations.

Awards he received include the Legion of Merit, the Meritorious Service Medal with award star, the Navy Commendation Medal with two award stars, the Coast Guard Commendation Medal and the Lifesaving Medal.

== Personal life ==
A native of Ohio, Chadwick is an ordained Presbyterian minister. Chadwick is a graduate of Ohio University, Pittsburgh Theological Seminary and Pepperdine University. He is married with three sons and six grandchildren.
