= Robert F. Burt =

American Navy officer

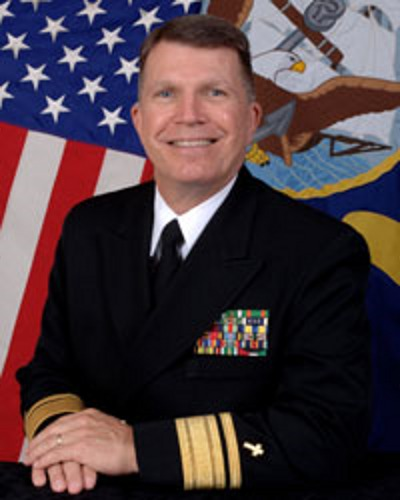
- Rear Admiral Robert F. Burt; 24th Chief of Chaplains of the United States Navy
- Born: March 1, 1948; Eugene, Oregon, U.S.
- Died: January 27, 2014 (aged 65); Silverdale, Washington, U.S.
- Military career
- Allegiance: United States of America
- Branch: United States Navy
- Service years: 1970 – 2010
- Rank: Rear Admiral

Chaplain (Rear Admiral) Robert Francis Burt, USN, (March 1, 1948 – January 27, 2014) was an American Navy officer who served as the 24th Chief of Chaplains of the United States Navy from 2006 to 2010.

== Early career and education ==
Burt joined the United States Navy in 1970, where he served aboard the USS Kitty Hawk after completing boot camp at the Naval Training Center Orlando, Florida. He finished his enlisted service in 1977. Afterwards, he obtained a bachelor's degree at Eugene Bible College and became a minister of the Open Bible Standard Churches.

== Decorations ==
Admiral Burt received the Legion of Merit, the Meritorious Service Medal (three awards), Navy Commendation Medal (two awards) and various service and campaign awards. He died in 2014 from multiple myeloma and is buried at Tahoma National Cemetery.

Military offices
Preceded by Louis V. Iasiello	Chaplain of the United States Marine Corps; Deputy Chief of Chaplains of the United States Navy; 2003–2006	Succeeded by Alan T. Baker
Preceded by Louis V. Iasiello	Chief of Chaplains of the United States Navy; 2006–2010	Succeeded by Mark L. Tidd
