= Leroy Gilbert =

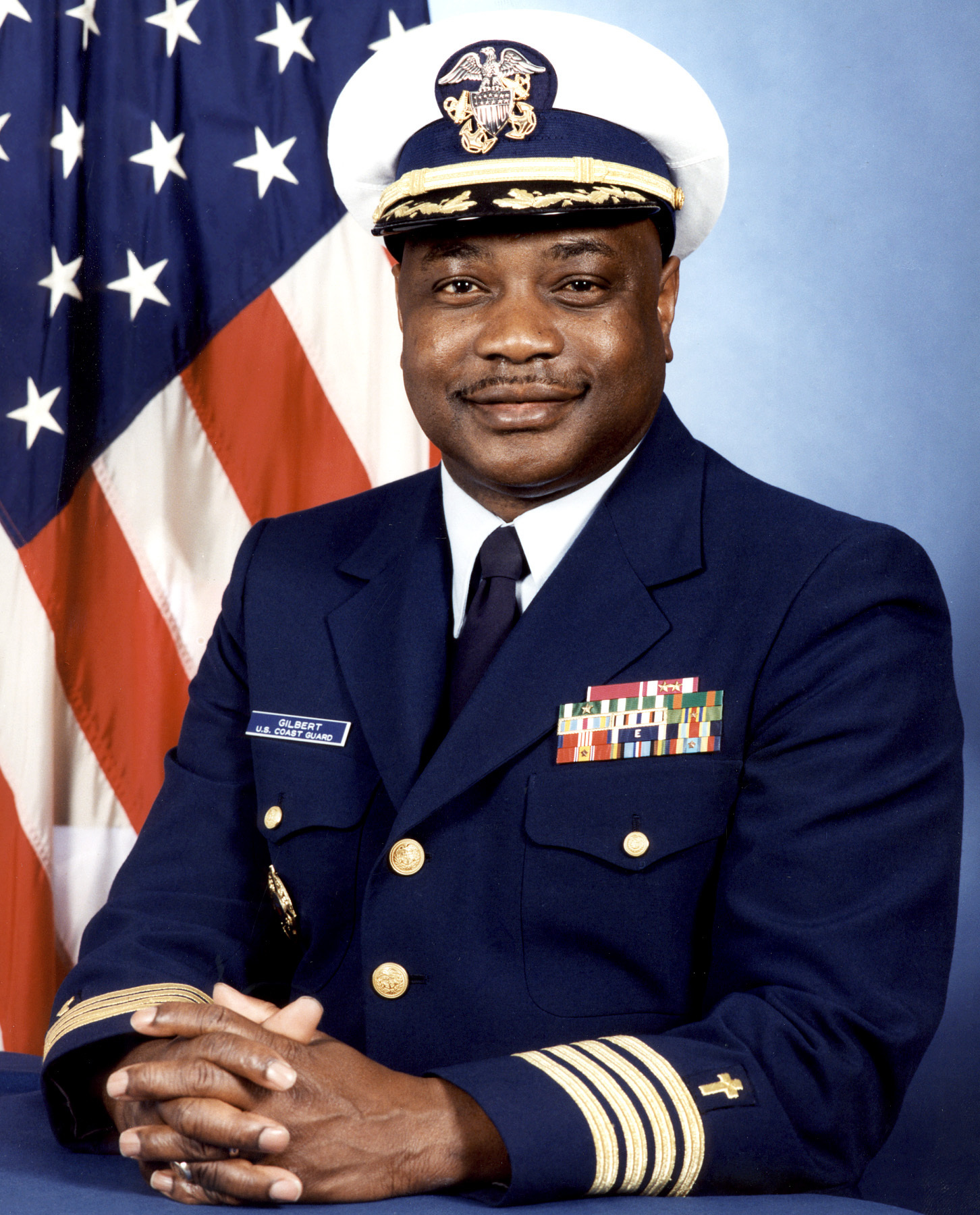
- Born: September 28, 1947 (age 78); Shellman, Georgia, U.S.
- Allegiance: United States
- Branch: United States Navy
- Service years: 1969–2006
- Rank: Captain
- Commands: Chaplain of the Coast Guard
- Awards: Legion of Merit; Meritorious Service Medal; Commendation Medal
- Spouse: Sharon Elizabeth Berry (m. 1972)

Leroy Gilbert (born September 28, 1947) is a former officer in the United States Navy and Chaplain of the United States Coast Guard.

== Biography ==
A native of Albany, Georgia, Gilbert is an ordained Baptist pastor. Gilbert holds a B.A. from American Baptist College, an M.Div. from Howard University, an S.T.M. from Yale Divinity School, and M.A. from United States International University, an Ed.D. from Nova Southeastern University and a Ph.D. from Regent University. He is married with one daughter.

== Career ==
Gilbert was commissioned as an officer in the United States Navy in 1969. He served as Chaplain of the United States Coast Guard from 1998 to 2002 before retiring in 2006. He then served as a pastor in Washington, D.C. He currently serves as Assistant Professor at the Regent University School of Divinity.
