= Gary P. Weeden =

American military chaplain

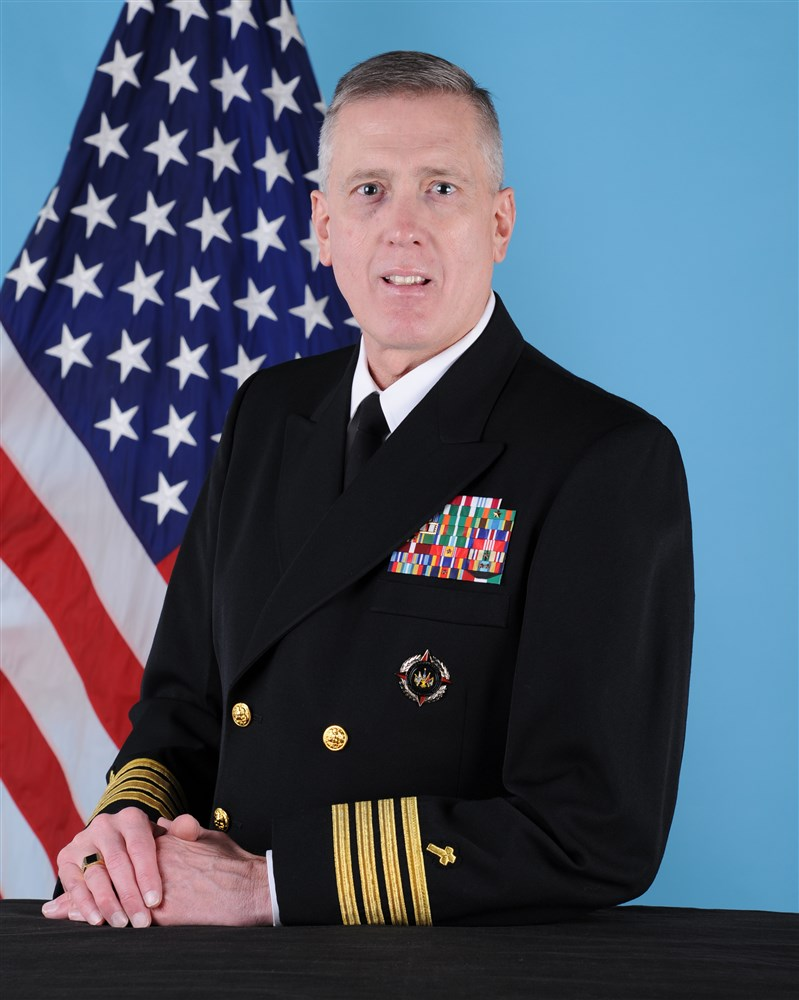
- Captain Gary P. Weeden as the command chaplain of U.S. European Command
- Military career
- Allegiance: United States of America
- Branch: United States Navy
- Service years: 1977-1981 (USCG); 1985-1987 (ANG); 1987-2016 (USN)
- Rank: Captain
- Awards: Legion of Merit

Chaplain Gary P. Weeden is a retired United States Navy captain who served as the command chaplain for United States European Command from 2014 to 2016. He previously served as the 9th Chaplain of the United States Coast Guard from 2010 to 2014. Weeden attended Western Seminary.

== Awards and decorations ==
Weeden's awards include:

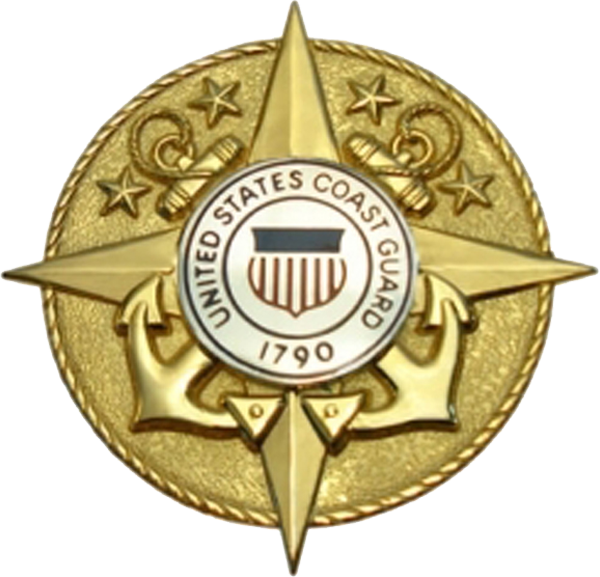

1st row	Legion of Merit		
2nd row	Defense Meritorious Service Medal	Meritorious Service Medal with four gold award stars	Coast Guard Commendation Medal
3rd row	Navy and Marine Corps Achievement Medal with award star	Air Force Achievement Medal	Commandant's Letter of Commendation Ribbon
4th row	Secretary of Transportation Outstanding Unit Award	Coast Guard Unit Commendation	Navy Meritorious Unit Commendation with one bronze service star
5th row	Coast Guard Meritorious Unit Commendation	Coast Guard Meritorious Team Commendation	Air Force Outstanding Unit Award
6th row	Coast Guard Good Conduct Medal	National Defense Service Medal with service star	Southwest Asia Service Medal with service star
7th row	Global War on Terrorism Expeditionary Medal	Global War on Terrorism Service Medal	Coast Guard Sea Service Ribbon
8th row	Navy Sea Service Deployment Ribbon with two service stars	Navy & Marine Corps Overseas Service Ribbon with service star	Kuwait Liberation Medal (Kuwait)
Badge	Commandant Staff Badge		
