= Brent W. Scott =

American Navy chaplain

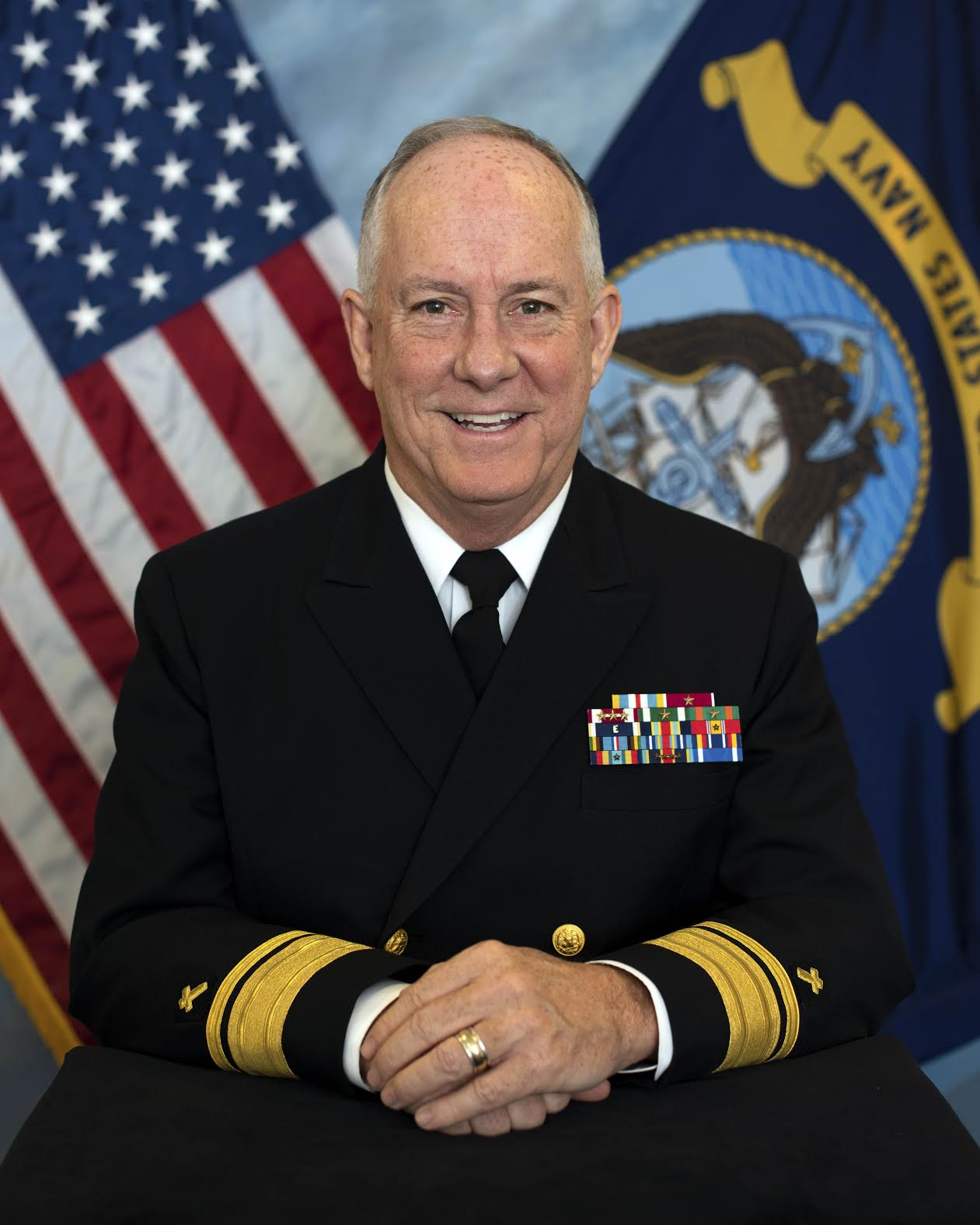
- Military career
- Allegiance: United States
- Branch: United States Navy
- Service years: 1992–2022
- Rank: Rear Admiral
- Commands: Chief of Chaplains of the United States Navy; Chaplain of the Marine Corps
- Awards: Defense Superior Service Medal; Legion of Merit (2)

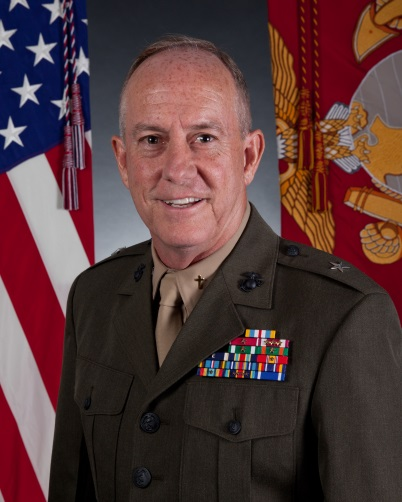
Rear Admiral Scott as 19th Chaplain of the United States Marine Corps

Brent William Scott is a retired United States Navy rear admiral and chaplain who last served as the 27th Chief of Chaplains of the United States Navy. He previously served as the 19th Chaplain of the United States Marine Corps and the Deputy Chief of Navy Chaplains.

== Career ==
A native of Amarillo, Texas, Scott graduated from Tascosa High School in 1973 and then attended West Texas A&M University. He received a Master of Divinity from Southwestern Baptist Theological Seminary in 1980. After twelve years as a civilian pastor, he received a commission in the United States Navy and was assigned to the 3rd Marine Air Wing in Yuma, Arizona, where from 1992 to 1995, he served as the battalion chaplain for both the 2nd and the 1st Light Anti-aircraft Missile Battalions. His next assignment was Naval Station Rota, Spain, where from 1995 to 1999, he served as chaplain for Marine Security Forces and the Naval Brig. Scott subsequently served Carrier Air Wing 7 in Oceana, Virginia, as the wing chaplain where he deployed with the Ike battle group for combat in the Mediterranean Sea, Adriatic Sea, and the Persian Gulf from 1999 to 2001. In 2002, Scott received a Master of Theology from the Duke Divinity School, and was then detailed to Naval Training Center, Great Lakes, Illinois, as a supervisory chaplain in one of the largest Religious Ministry Teams in the Navy.

The appointment of Scott as Chief of Chaplains of the United States Navy was confirmed by the United States Senate in April 2018 without the customary promotion to two-star rear admiral. However on November 13, 2018, Scott was nominated by the President for appointment to the rank of rear admiral, while serving as Chief of Chaplains. His promotion was approved by the Senate on December 12.

Scott holds a Master of Arts degree in National Security and Strategic Studies from the Naval War College.

== Awards and decorations ==
Defense Superior Service Medal
Legion of Merit with one gold award star
Meritorious Service Medal with three award stars
Navy and Marine Corps Commendation Medal with award star
Navy and Marine Corps Achievement Medal with award star
Navy "E" Ribbon
Fleet Marine Force Ribbon
National Defense Service Medal with one bronze service star
Armed Forces Expeditionary Medal
Global War on Terrorism Expeditionary Medal
Global War on Terrorism Service Medal
Navy Sea Service Deployment Ribbon with service star
Navy and Marine Corps Overseas Service Ribbon with four service stars
NATO Medal for the former Yugoslavia

Military offices
Preceded by Margaret G. Kibben	Chaplain of the United States Marine Corps and Deputy Chief of Chaplains of the United States Navy; 2014–2018	Succeeded by Gregory N. Todd
Preceded by Margaret G. Kibben	Chief of Chaplains of the United States Navy; 2018–2022	Succeeded by Gregory N. Todd
