= Alan T. Baker =

American Navy Officer

Alan "Blues" T. Baker
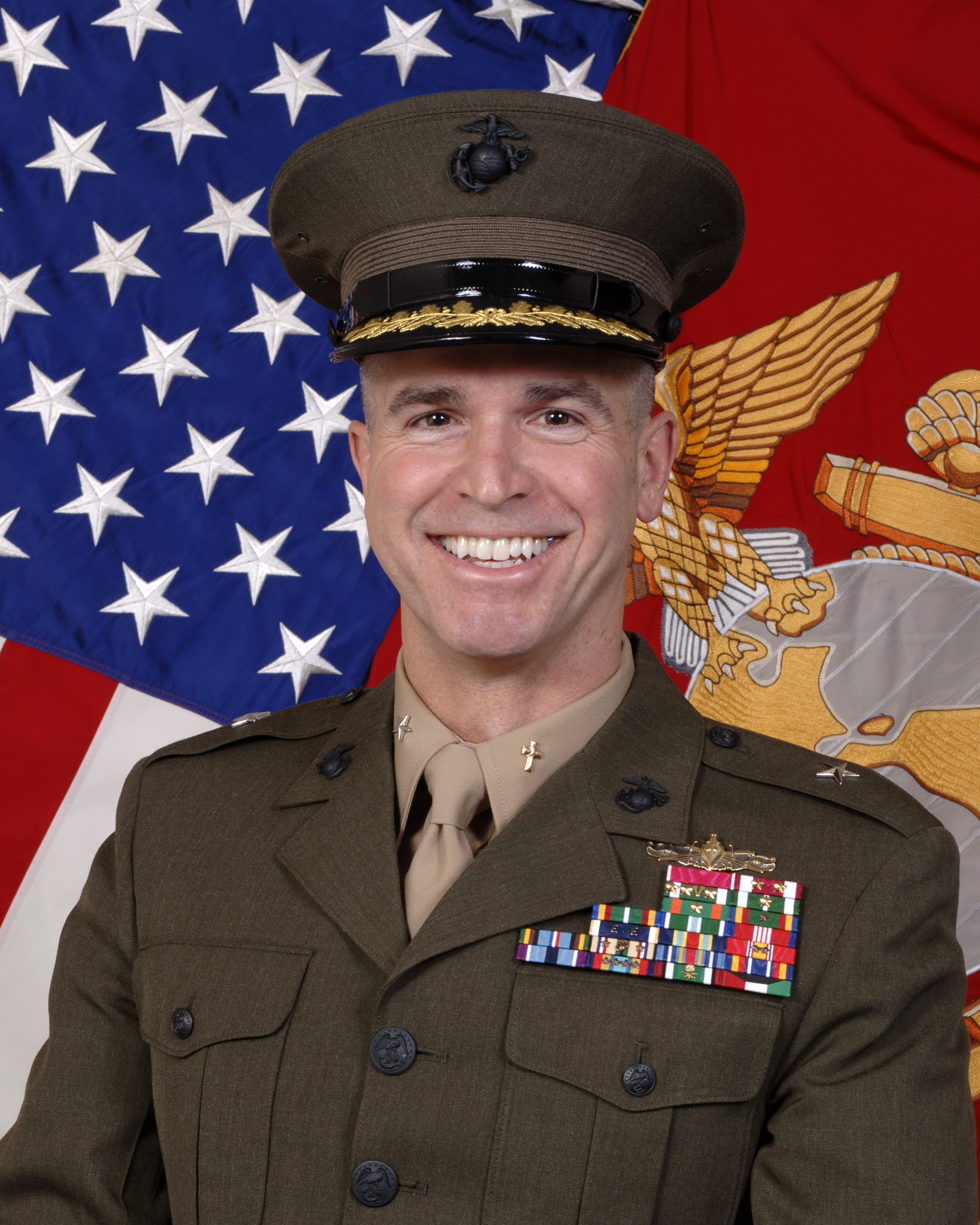
- Rear Admiral Alan T. Baker; 16th Chaplain of the United States Marine Corps
- Born: Santa Ana, California, U.S.
- Military career
- Allegiance: USA
- Branch: United States Navy
- Service years: 1978–2009
- Rank: Rear Admiral
- Commands: Chaplain of the Marine Corps/Deputy Chief of Navy Chaplains
- Conflicts: Gulf War
- Awards: Legion of Merit

Rear Admiral Alan T. Baker, USN (born in Santa Ana, CA, 1956), is a retired American Navy officer who served as the 16th Chaplain of the United States Marine Corps from 2006 to 2009. Chaplain Baker was the first graduate of the United States Naval Academy and former Surface Warfare Officer to serve as a Chaplain Corps Flag Officer. Following his military career, Baker served as Directional Leader at Menlo Park Presbyterian Church, a 4,000-member, multi-campus church in the San Francisco Bay Area, from 2010 to 2012. He is currently principal of Strategic Foundations where he teaches, coaches and catalyzes organizations valuing the intersection of faith, learning and leadership.

== Biography ==
Alan "Blues" T. Baker graduated with merit from the United States Naval Academy in 1978 and reported to USS Brooke for his first sea tour. He returned to the Naval Academy in 1981 as an instructor in the Department of Professional Development. Answering the call to ministry in 1984, Baker transferred to the Naval Reserve while attending seminary.

Graduating from Fuller Theological Seminary with a Master of Divinity degree in 1987, Baker was ordained by the Reformed Church in America and recalled to active duty as a Navy chaplain. His first Chaplain Corps assignment was as a Ship's Chaplain of USS Richmond K. Turner in which he deployed to the Persian Gulf supporting Operation Earnest Will escorts of reflagged Kuwaiti tankers.

Baker reported for service with the United States Marine Corps in 1990. During combat operations to liberate Kuwait in the first Gulf War, he provided ministry in the field to the Marines and supporting units of Marine Aircraft Group 11.

In 1992, Baker began three years on staff at the Naval Chaplains School as primary instructor and administrator for the Chaplain Basic Course providing initial training to newly commissioned Navy Chaplains. Following a tour as chaplain with the United States Coast Guard in New York (1995 to 1998), Baker was ordered to the Staff of the Chief of Navy Chaplains in Washington, D.C. where he served as Branch Head of Chaplain Corps Professional Development.

In 1997 Baker received a Doctorate from Gordon-Conwell Theological Seminary in Massachusetts. He has an additional professional subspecialty in Education and Training Management.

In 2001, he reported as Command Chaplain of USS Harry S. Truman with additional duties as Carrier Strike Group Chaplain in Operation Enduring Freedom. In 2003, Baker assumed duties as Senior Chaplain Corps detailer at the Bureau of Naval Personnel in Millington, Tennessee where he was responsible for worldwide assignments of chaplains throughout the Sea Services.

In 2004, thirty years after arriving as a Plebe, Baker returned to the United States Naval Academy as Command Chaplain, where he was responsible for religious support to the 4,300-member Brigade of Midshipmen as well as management of the Academy's historic chapels.

In 2006, Baker was promoted to rear admiral (lower half) and became the 16th Chaplain of the Marine Corps, succeeding Rear Admiral Robert Burt, who was promoted to become the U.S. Navy's Chief of Chaplains.

In 2006, Baker attended the Executive Business Course at the Naval Postgraduate School in Monterey, California, and in 2007, received an Honorary Doctor of Divinity degree from Grove City College in Pennsylvania.

In 2010, Baker joined the staff of Menlo Park Presbyterian Church in the newly created role of Directional Leader. In this role, Baker partnered with Senior Pastor John Ortberg in casting and executing the vision for the church, which has locations in Menlo Park, San Mateo, and Mountain View, CA. That same year Baker was named a visiting fellow at the Institute for Public Service and Policy Development at Nyack College, Washington DC where he served in an advisory role on leadership studies.

In 2013, Gordon-Conwell Theological Seminary appointed him as Adjunct Professor, and he was also named Chaplain Endorsing Agent and Supervisor of Chaplain Ministries for the Reformed Church in America. In 2014, he was appointed Adjunct Faculty at Fuller Theological Seminary. In 2015, he was named Senior Fellow at the United States Naval Academy Stockdale Center for Ethical Leadership. As principal consultant with Strategic Foundations, he also teaches, coaches and advises organizations on vision development and implementation.

In 2021, Baker authored Foundations of Chaplaincy, published by William B. Eerdmans Publishing Company. The book examines Chaplaincy and describes four specific responsibilities and skills that define Chaplaincy’s “ministry of presence”: providing, facilitating, caring, and advising.

== Awards and decoration ==
Chaplain Baker's personal decorations include:

Legion of Merit
Meritorious Service Medal with two award stars
Navy and Marine Corps Commendation Medal with three award stars and valor device
Coast Guard Commendation Medal with one award star
Navy and Marine Corps Achievement Medal with one award star

== See also ==
Chaplain of the United States Marine Corps

== Attribution ==
This article incorporates text in the public domain from the United States Marine Corps.

Military offices
Preceded by Robert F. Burt	Chaplain of the United States Marine Corps; Deputy Chief of Chaplains of the United States Navy; 2006–2009	Succeeded by Mark L. Tidd
