= Louis Iasiello =

American Roman Catholic priest and naval officer, former US Navy Chief of Chaplains

The Reverend Louis V. Iasiello OFM
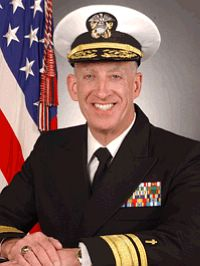
- Rear Admiral Fr. Louis V. Iasiello; 23rd Chief of Chaplains of the United States Navy
- Born: Louis Vito Iasiello Jr. 6 September 1950 (age 76); Staten Island, New York, U.S.
- Military career
- Allegiance: United States
- Branch: United States Navy
- Service years: 1981–2006
- Rank: Rear Admiral

Louis V. Iasiello, OFM, USN (born 6 September 1950) is a Catholic priest and retired US Navy officer who served as the 23rd Chief of Chaplains of the United States Navy from 2003 to 2006.

He is a well known Just War theorist. For 18 months after his retirement from the Navy, he was the president of Washington Theological Union. He accepted a position as a professor of humanities at Pontifical College Josephinum in Columbus, Ohio, in 2010. In 2024 he accepted the position of Academic Dean at Mount St. Mary's Seminary in Emmitsburg, Maryland.

== Background and education ==
Iasiello grew up in Staten Island, New York. He is an alumnus of St. Bonaventure University (1972), with a bachelor's degree in history. He has earned graduate degrees from Niagara University (Education) (1973), the Washington Theological Union (Divinity) (1977), the Naval War College (National Security and Strategic Studies) (1991), Salve Regina College (International Relations) (1992), and a PhD from Salve Regina University (2003). His doctoral thesis was titled Jus in bello: Key issues for a contemporary assessment of just behavior in war.

== Career ==
Iasiello was received into the Order of Friars Minor in August 1973 and is a member of the Franciscan Friars of Holy Name Province. After his ordination as a deacon, he worked in Anapolis, Brazil. He was ordained to the priesthood on 13 May 1978, and was assigned to a Franciscan parish serving the Hispanic community in the Bronx. He then became the head of the Modern Languages department at Bishop Timon High School in Buffalo, New York.

== Military and Post-military Career ==
Iasiello was commissioned as a Navy Chaplain Lieutenant (Junior Grade) in the Naval Reserves in 1981 and was recalled to active duty July 1983. His active duty assignments include: Naval Air Station, Memphis (83–85); U.S. Coast Guard, Kodiak, Alaska (85–86); USS Ranger (CV-61) deployed in Operation Earnest Will, and in other deployments to Korea and the Persian Gulf (86–87); Second Marine Division; (8th Marine Regiment, 2nd Marine Regiment, Marine Forces Panama) including two deployments to Norway, Operation Just Cause, Panama, and with the 26th Marine Expeditionary Unit, Special Operations Capable (MEU SOC) (87–90). Other assignments include: Naval War College Command and Staff, distinguished military graduate (90–91); United States Naval Academy, staff and faculty (91–94); Joint Task Force 160 (Cuba and Haiti); Armed Forces Staff College (94); Assistant Fleet Chaplain, U.S. Atlantic Fleet and Deputy Chaplain, U.S. Atlantic Command (94–97); Director for Operational Ministry, Atlantic Fleet (97–98); and Director, Naval Chaplains School (98–00). After selection to flag rank, Iasiello became the first Chaplain Corps flag officer to be appointed Chaplain of the United States Marine Corps (00–03). He has served on a Defense Task Force and has lectured at a number of the military's war and staff colleges. The Senate confirmed his appointment as the 23rd Chief of Navy Chaplains, July 2003. He retired October 2006 and assumed the duties of President of the Washington Theological Union. Admiral Iasiello then served as co-chair of the Defense Task Force on Sexual Assault in the Military Services from 2008 through 2010. He has served on numerous boards and advisory councils, including the Board of Advisors of the Institute on Religion and Public Policy. He is currently on the board of the Franciscan Monastery of the HolyLand, Washington, DC. In 2010, he took at position as a professor of Humanities and Director of Human Formation at the Pontifical College Josephinum, Columbus, Ohio.. In 2024 he accepted the position of Academic Dean at Mount St. Mary's Seminary in Emmitsburg, Maryland.

Personal decorations include the Legion of Merit (Gold Star in lieu of second award), the Defense Meritorious Service Medal, the Meritorious Service Medal (three awards); Navy/Marine Corps Commendation Medal (two awards), Coast Guard Commendation Medal; Navy and Marine Corps Achievement Medal; the Combat Action Ribbon and numerous other unit and service citations and awards.

In 1999, as a Navy Chaplain, Iasiello assisted at the burials at sea of John F. Kennedy Jr., his wife, Carolyn Bessette, and her sister, Lauren Bessette.

== Publications ==
Iasiello has been published in numerous periodicals and books, most recently in the Naval War College Review (Summer/Fall 04): Jus Post Bellum: Moral Obligations of the Victors of War.; "Betrayal of Trust: David and Bathsheba Revisited." New Theology Review Volume 21, Number 2, May 2008.

Military offices
Preceded by Barry C. Black	Chaplain of the United States Marine Corps; Deputy Chief of Chaplains of the United States Navy; 2000–2003	Succeeded by Robert F. Burt
Preceded by Barry C. Black	Chief of Chaplains of the United States Navy; 2003–2006	Succeeded by Robert F. Burt
