= Emmett Hulcy Tidd =

United States Navy flag officer

Emmett Hulcy
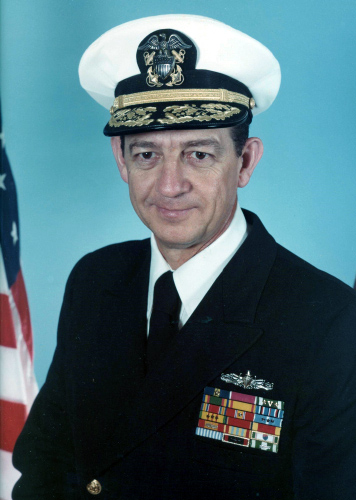
- Vice Admiral Emmett H. Tidd as Commander Naval Surface Forces Pacific
- Born: October 6, 1923; Shreveport, Louisiana, U.S.
- Died: March 20, 2018 (aged 94); Annapolis, Maryland, U.S.
- Relatives: Admiral Kurt W. Tidd (son); Rear Admiral Mark L. Tidd (son)
- Military career
- Allegiance: United States
- Branch: United States Navy
- Service years: 1942–1976
- Rank: Vice Admiral
- Commands: Naval Surface Force, Pacific Fleet; Navy Recruiting Command; Cruiser Destroyer Flotilla Six; Task Group 60.2; Task Group 502.2; USS Everglades (AD-24); USS Charles F. Adams (DDG-2); USS Richard B. Anderson (DD-786); USS Force (AM-445)
- Conflicts: World War II; Korean War; Vietnam War
- Awards: Navy Distinguished Service Medal (3); Legion of Merit

Vice Admiral Emmett Hulcy Tidd (October 6, 1923 – March 20, 2018) was a flag officer of the United States Navy from 1942-1976. He served in World War II, Korea, and Vietnam, and commanded Naval Surface Force, Pacific Fleet in 1975-6.

== Early life and education ==
Tidd was born in Shreveport, Louisiana, on October 6, 1923. After graduating from Central High School in Oklahoma City, Oklahoma, he attended the University of Oklahoma at Norman; his college time was cut short due to his early commissioning, and he completed his bachelor's degree in 1948.

== Naval career ==
Tidd enlisted in the Navy Reserve as a seaman apprentice in 1942 and joined the Naval Reserve Officers Training Corps while at Oklahoma University. Commissioned an ensign in 1945, he was assigned to the pre-commissioning crew attached to the destroyer USS Gyatt (DD-712), and became that ship's assistant first lieutenant and damage control officer upon its commissioning on July 2, 1945. He departed Gyatt in 1946, and left active duty to complete his degree, continuing in the Naval Reserve.

At the outbreak of the Korean War, Tidd volunteered for active duty, received promotion to Lieutenant junior grade, and was assigned to USS Frank E. Evans (DD-754), which had been recommissioned for Korean War service. While aboard Evans, he participated in the Siege of Wonsan in 1951. He served in the Officer Procurement Office in the Bureau of Naval Personnel from March 1952 to April 1954 and was selected for transfer to the active duty force during this time. Upon completing his tour at BUPERS, he served as an operations officer aboard USS Radford (DD-446), participating in the evacuation of the Tachen Islands off the coast of China. While aboard Radford, Tidd was assigned as antisubmarine warfare and gunnery officer on the staff of Escort Destroyer Squadron One. Tidd took command of USS Force (AM-445) in November 1956, and participated in special operations in both the Atlantic and Pacific Oceans; he also received promotion to lieutenant commander during this tour. After completing his command tour aboard Force, he attended the Naval War College Command and Staff Course from August 1958 to June 1959 and afterward served in the Strategic Plans Division in the Office of the Chief of Naval Operations, the first of two tours in that division.

Promoted to commander, he assumed command of USS Richard B. Anderson (DD-786) in May 1961. While in command of Anderson, the ship participated in Operation Swordfish, standing duty as the standby firing ship and surface scientific camera party platform for the first-ever firing of an ASROC anti-submarine rocket equipped with a nuclear warhead. Anderson also deployed to the Eastern Pacific during the Cuban Missile Crisis. In April 1963, then-Commander Tidd assumed command of USS Charles F. Adams (DDG-2), relinquishing command the following June and beginning his second stint in the Strategic Plans Division. In June 1968, having been promoted to captain, Tidd assumed command of USS Everglades (AD-24), followed by a tour as Chief of Staff and Aide to Vice Admiral Elmo Zumwalt, then serving as Commander, Naval Forces Vietnam. Following his Vietnam tour, Tidd was assigned to assume command of USS Columbus (CG-12), but was redirected to Washington after being selected for promotion to rear admiral.

Tidd was promoted to rear admiral in 1970, and served, as a rear admiral designee, as Special Assistant to the Chief of Naval Operations (by then now-Admiral Elmo Zumwalt), and Vice Chief of Naval Operations for Decision Coordination (OP-09C), a position he held from June 1970 to August 1971. Upon leaving Washington, he assumed command of Cruiser Destroyer Flotilla Six and embarked aboard USS America (CVA-66) as Commander Task Group 56.2 and Commander Task Group 502.2. In April 1972, Tidd assumed command of Navy Recruiting Command and was tasked with preparing for the transition to an all-volunteer force. He was promoted to vice admiral in 1974 and remained in his position as NRC commander. In June 1975, Todd assumed command of Naval Surface Force, Pacific Fleet; while serving in this position, the Navy completed efforts to combine all Pacific Fleet surface, amphibious, and SEAL forces under the SURFPAC umbrella.

== Retirement ==
Vice Admiral Tidd retired in August 1976. After retiring, he served on the board of directors for Atlas Van Lines and the Armed Services YMCA, serving as the latter's chairman in 1981 and 1982. He died on March 20, 2018, at the age of 94.

== Awards ==
Tidd's awards include:

- Distinguished Service Medal with two gold stars
- Legion of Merit
- Navy Commendation Medal with two gold stars and Combat V
- Navy Unit Commendation with star
- Naval Reserve Medal
- American Campaign Medal
- World War 2 Victory Medal
- China Service Medal
- National Defense Service Medal with bronze star
- Korean Service Medal with three stars
- United Nations Service Medal
- Vietnam Service Medal

== Personal life ==
Tidd married his wife Margaret in 1945. His sons also became Navy flag officers; Kurt Tidd is a retired admiral (2018), and Mark Tidd retired in 2014 as a rear admiral and Chief of Navy Chaplains. A daughter in law also served in the Navy.
