= Mark L. Tidd =

United States admiral

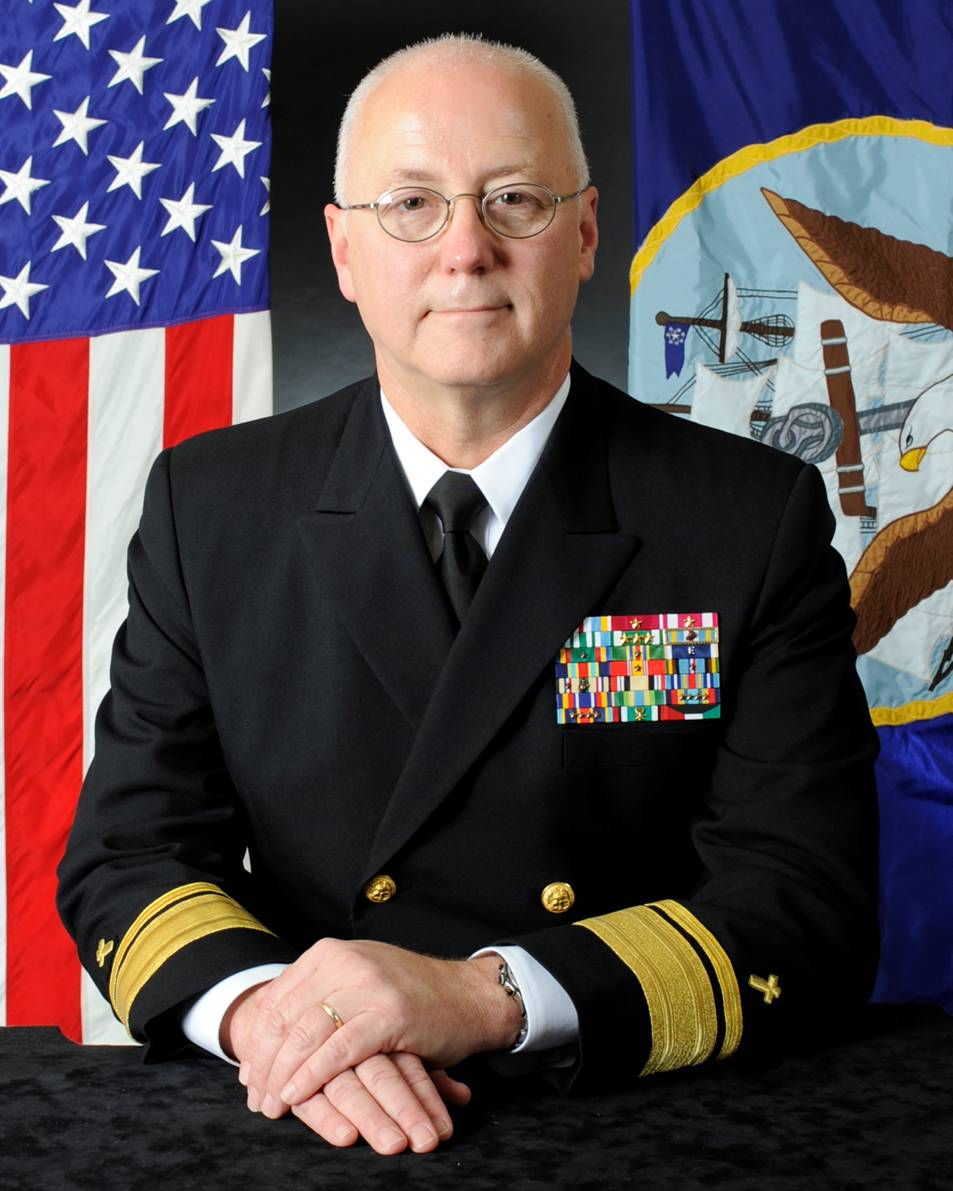
- Tidd in 2010
- Born: May 8, 1955; Honolulu, Hawaii, U.S.
- Died: February 22, 2025 (aged 69)
- Relatives: Vice Admiral Emmett H. Tidd (father); Admiral Kurt W. Tidd (brother)
- Military career
- Allegiance: United States
- Branch: United States Navy
- Service years: 1978–2014
- Rank: Rear Admiral
- Commands: Chief of Chaplains of the United States Navy
- Conflicts: Gulf War; Iraq War
- Awards: Navy Distinguished Service Medal; Defense Superior Service Medal; Legion of Merit (2)

Mark Luzerne Tidd (May 8, 1955 - February 22, 2025) was a former United States Navy officer who served as the 25th Chief of Chaplains of the United States Navy from 2010 to 2014.

== Early life and education ==
Tidd comes from a career navy family; his father, Emmett H. Tidd was a vice admiral during the Vietnam War and was the commander of all naval surface forces in the Pacific. His brother, Admiral Kurt W. Tidd, was the commander of all United States forces in South America. He is a 1977 graduate of Williams College in Williamstown, Massachusetts.

Tidd, a Presbyterian minister, received his Master of Divinity from Fuller Theological Seminary, a Master of Theology from Princeton Theological Seminary and a Doctor of Ministry from Pittsburgh Theological Seminary in 2018. He is a graduate of the National War College in Washington, D.C., with a Master of Science in National Security Strategy and a graduate of the Marine Corps Command and Staff College and the Armed Forces Staff College.

== Naval career ==
Tidd's navy tours include Naval Air Station Moffett Field, California, with Patrol Wing 10 and the USS Reeves (CG-24), homeported in Yokosuka, Japan. During his time on board, Reeves visited Qingdao, China, as part of the first port visit by United States warships to China in 39 years. He went on to serve as deputy command chaplain aboard USS Theodore Roosevelt.

Marine Corps tours include 3rd Battalion, 2nd Marines, and the division staff of 2nd Marine Division, Camp Lejeune, North Carolina, deploying to Southwest Asia in support of Operation Desert Storm. He served at Marine Corps Combat Development Command as the chaplain for the Marine Corps Brig and the Base Security Battalion and later returned to 2nd Marine Division as the division chaplain.

Tidd served in leadership positions on the chief of Chaplain's staff as the branch head for Professional Development and Religious Programs and as the Advanced Training officer at Navy Chaplain School. Tidd was assigned as the force chaplain for United States Naval Forces Central Command and the fleet chaplain for United States Fifth Fleet, headquartered in the Kingdom of Bahrain. After serving as command chaplain for the United States European Command, he became deputy chief of Navy Chaplains and Chaplain of the Marine Corps.

=== Chief of Navy Chaplains ===
Tidd assumed his duties as the 25th Chief of Chaplains of the United States Navy on August 27, 2010. He retired on August 1, 2014.

On April 13, 2011, Tidd issued a two-page "guidance" memo stating that following final repeal of don't ask, don't tell, the law barring openly gay people from military service, same-sex couples would be allowed to marry in Naval facilities with Naval chaplains officiating in those states in which same-sex marriage is legal. Following political pressure from Republican members of Congress who claimed that allowing the use of federal facilities or personnel to perform same-sex marriages would violate the Defense of Marriage Act, Tidd suspended the policy on May 10, pending further Naval review.

== Awards and decorations ==
Navy Distinguished Service Medal
Defense Superior Service Medal
Legion of Merit with gold award star
Meritorious Service Medal with award star
Joint Service Commendation Medal
Navy and Marine Corps Commendation Medal with 3 award stars
Joint Meritorious Unit Award with one bronze oak leaf cluster
Navy Unit Commendation with bronze service star
Navy Meritorious Unit Commendation with service star
Navy "E" Ribbon
Fleet Marine Force Ribbon
National Defense Service Medal with service star
Armed Forces Expeditionary Medal with service star
Southwest Asia Service Medal with Fleet Marine Force insignia and bronze service star
Iraq Campaign Medal
Global War on Terrorism Expeditionary Medal
Global War on Terrorism Service Medal
Armed Forces Service Medal
Navy Sea Service Deployment Ribbon with 4 service stars
Navy and Marine Corps Overseas Service Ribbon with one silver and three bronze service stars
Kuwait Liberation Medal (Saudi Arabia)
Kuwait Liberation Medal (Kuwait)

== See also ==
- Armed Forces Chaplains Board

Military offices
Preceded by Alan T. Baker	Chaplain of the United States Marine Corps; Deputy Chief of Chaplains of the United States Navy; 2009–2010	Succeeded by Margaret G. Kibben
Preceded by Robert F. Burt	Chief of Chaplains of the United States Navy; 2010–2014	Succeeded by Margaret G. Kibben
