= Kurt W. Tidd =

United States admiral (born 1956)

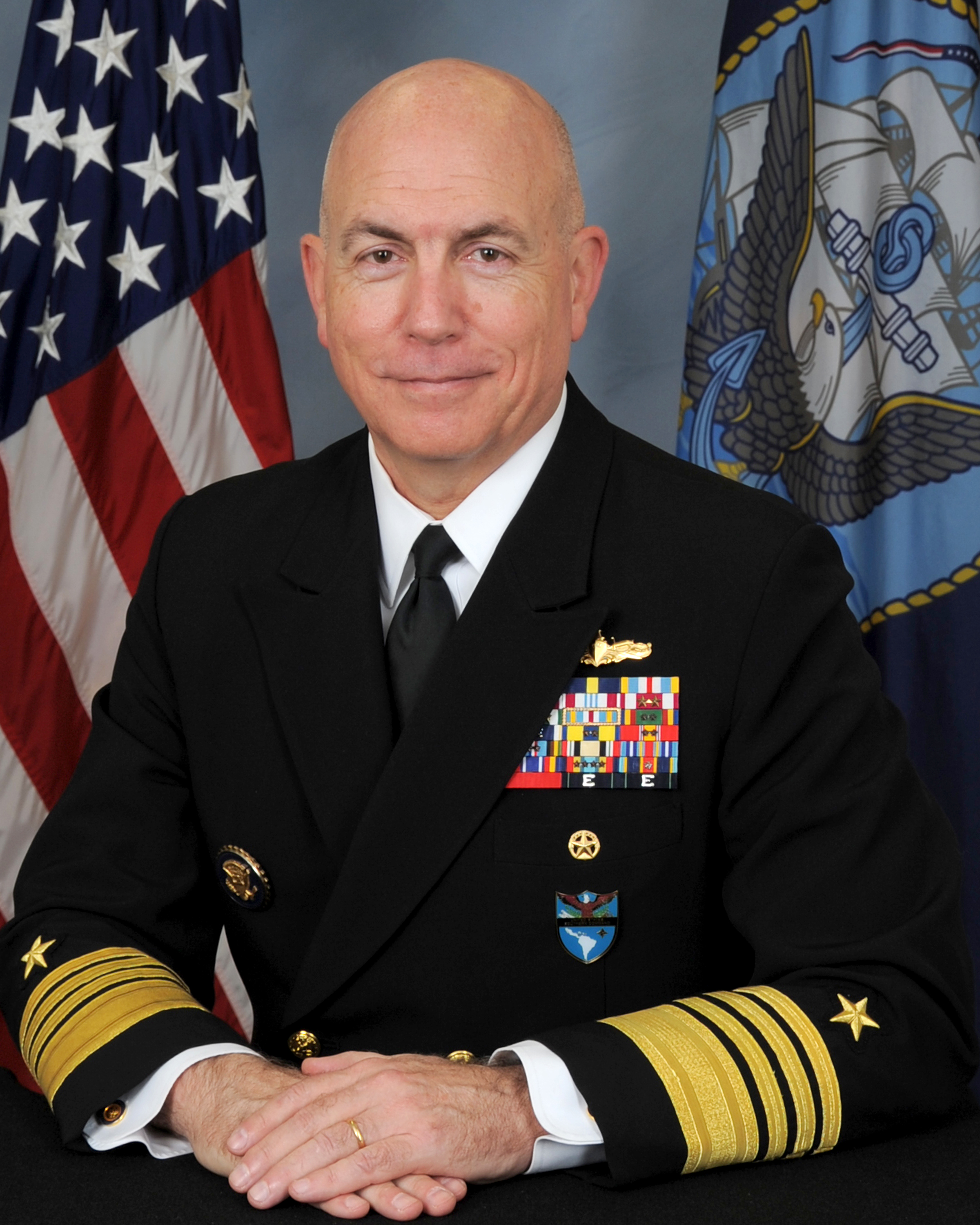
- Admiral Kurt W. Tidd
- Born: March 26, 1956 (age 70); Honolulu, Hawaii, U.S.
- Relatives: Emmett Hulcy Tidd (father); Mark L. Tidd (brother)
- Military career
- Allegiance: United States
- Branch: United States Navy
- Service years: 1978–2018
- Rank: Admiral
- Commands: United States Southern Command; United States Naval Forces Southern Command; United States Fourth Fleet; Carrier Strike Group 8 Middle East Force; Task Force 55; Destroyer Squadron 50; USS Arthur W. Radford (DD-968)
- Conflicts: War in Afghanistan; Iraq War
- Awards: Defense Distinguished Service Medal (3); Navy Distinguished Service Medal; Defense Superior Service Medal; Legion of Merit (4)

Kurt Walter Tidd (born March 26, 1956) is a retired United States Navy admiral. He last served as the Commander, United States Southern Command. Prior to that assignment, Tidd served as Assistant to the Chairman of the Joint Chiefs of Staff. He also served as the Director for Operations, Joint Staff (J-3) from 2012 to 2013, and as Commander, United States Naval Forces Southern Command and United States Fourth Fleet from August 5, 2011, to June 22, 2012. Confirmed by the Senate on December 16, 2015, Tidd received his fourth star and succeeded John F. Kelly as commander of United States Southern Command on January 14, 2016. Tidd held the title of "Old salt", which means he received his qualification for Surface Warfare before any other active-duty navy officer. He passed said title to Admiral Philip S. Davidson upon his retirement. Upon the May 30, 2018, retirement of his United States Naval Academy classmate, Admiral Harry B. Harris Jr., Tidd also gained the honorific of "Old Goat" – the longest-serving Naval Academy graduate on active duty. Harris presented Tidd with the Old Goat decanter in a ceremony on April 11, 2018.

== Early life and education ==
Tidd was born on March 26, 1956, in Honolulu, Hawaii. He is a second-generation surface warfare officer. He is the son of Vice Admiral Emmett H. Tidd, who was the commander of all naval surface forces in the Pacific during the Vietnam War and his brother, Rear Admiral Mark L. Tidd, was the 25th Chief of Navy Chaplains. Tidd grew up in various cities on the East and West coasts before graduating in 1974 from the Porter-Gaud School in Charleston, South Carolina. Tidd was commissioned from the United States Naval Academy in 1978 with a Bachelor of Science in Foreign Area Studies.

== Naval career ==
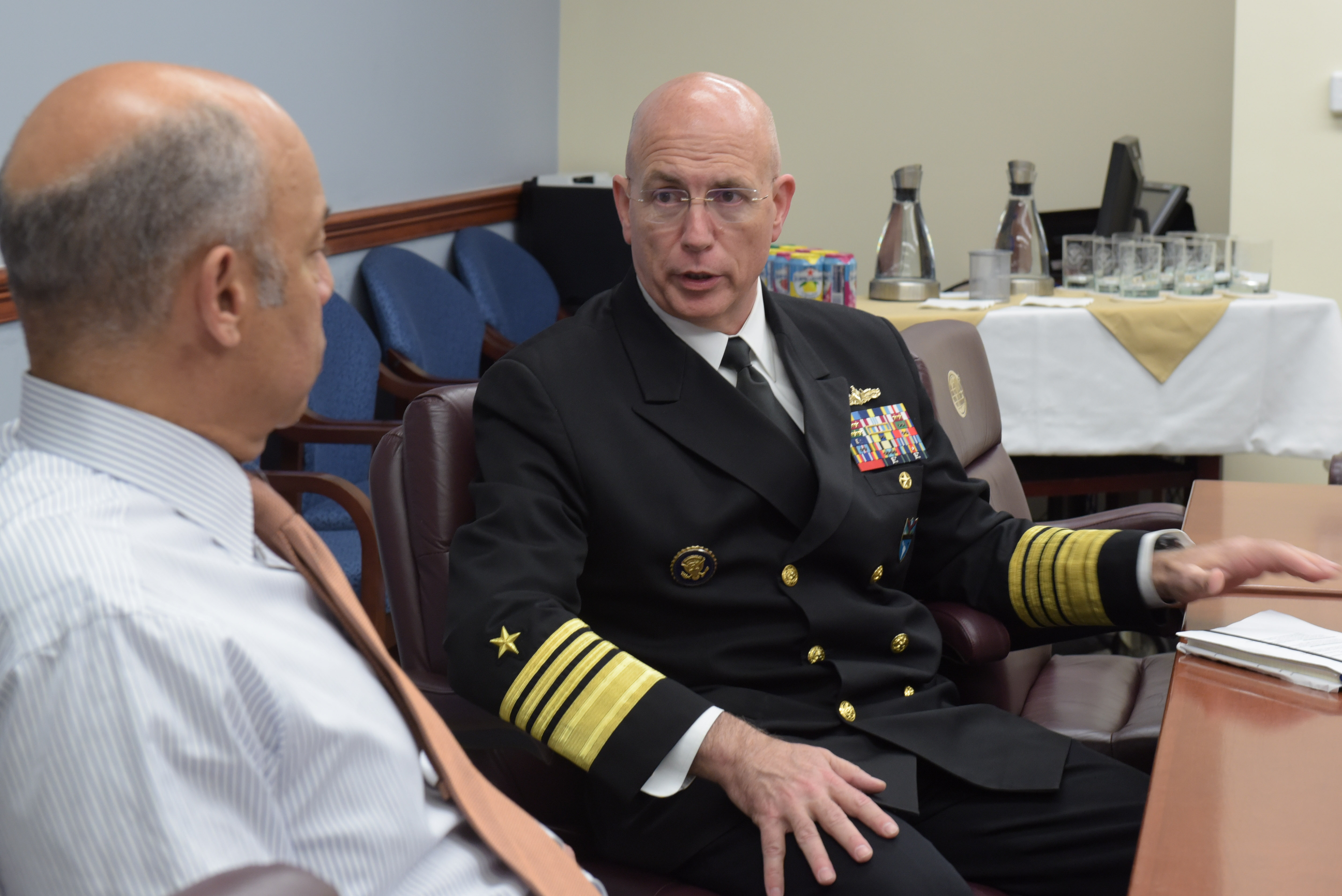
Tidd meets with Secretary of Homeland Security Jeh Johnson in Washington, D.C., on March 8, 2016.

Tidd was appointed Director of Strategic Capabilities Policy, Defense Policy Directorate in July 2006. He joined the National Security Council staff in March 2005 as Director for Strategy and Defense Issues, Directorate of Combating Terrorism. His responsibilities included developing and coordinating inter-agency policy on countering weapons of mass destruction terrorism, threats to international aviation security, and maritime security policy. From January 2004 to March 2005, Tidd commanded Persian Gulf maritime war on terror operations as Commander, Middle East Force and Commander Task Force 55.

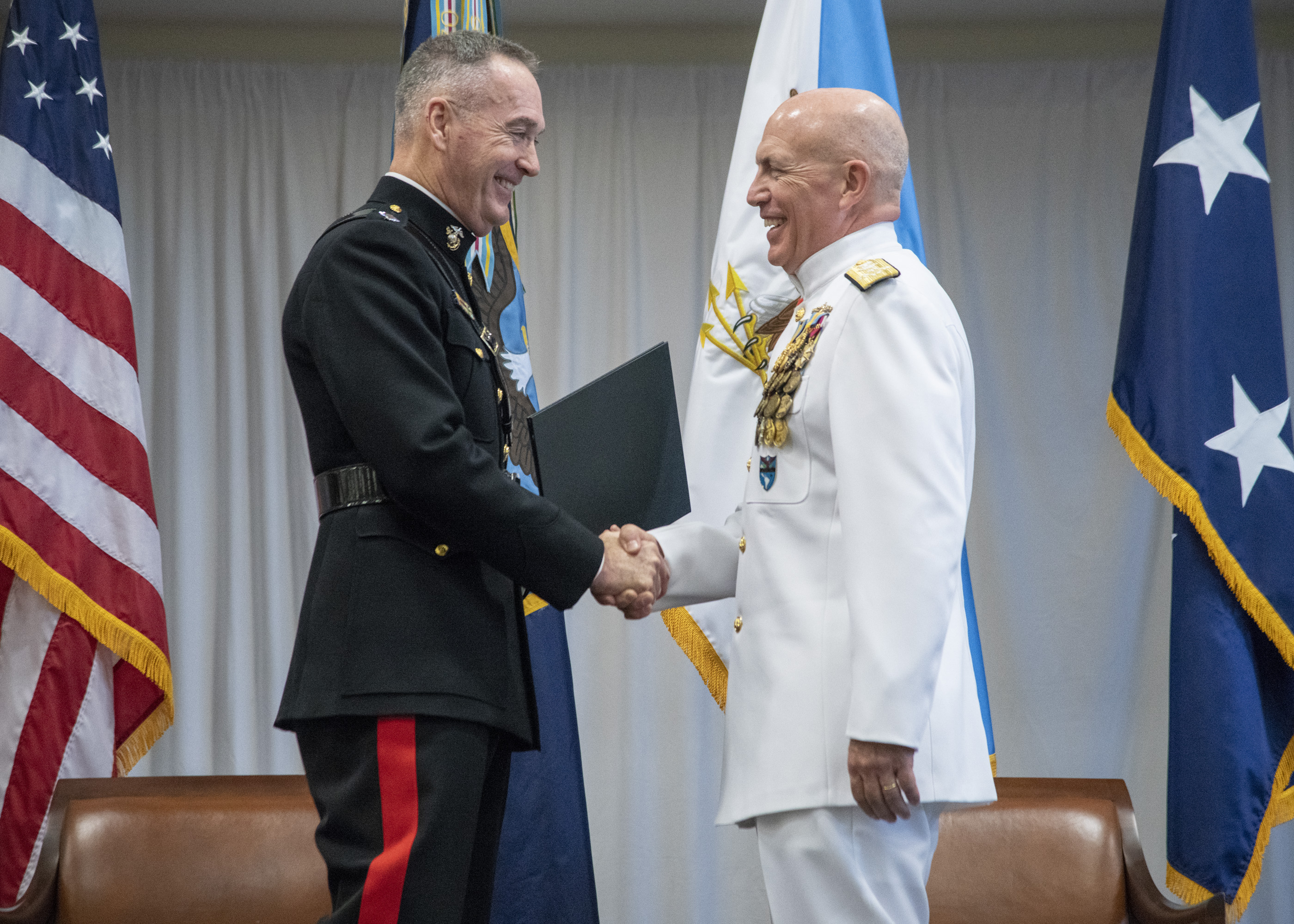
Tidd is congratulated by General Joseph Dunford, chairman of the Joint Chiefs of Staff, at his retirement ceremony on November 26, 2018.

Tidd was the founding Deputy for Operations on the Chief of Naval Operations War on Terrorism Operations Planning Group Deep Blue. Prior to that, he was the Assistant Chief of Staff for Operations (N-3) to Commander, United States Naval Forces Central Command and Commander, United States Fifth Fleet in Manama, Bahrain. He served in NATO Headquarters, Brussels, Belgium as aide to the U.S. Representative, NATO Military Committee. In The Pentagon, he worked on the Navy Staff in the Strategy and Policy Division (N-51), and as the Political-Military Analyst in the Secretary of the Navy's Office of Program Appraisal. Tidd also was the Strategic Planner on the Chief of Naval Operations' Executive Panel (N-00K). Sea duty assignments include Communications Officer and Main Propulsion Assistant in USS Semmes (DDG-18), Boilers Officer in USS America (CV-66), Flag Lieutenant to Commander, Cruiser-Destroyer Group 8, and Operations Officer in USS Deyo (DD-989). Tidd was executive officer in USS Leftwich (DD-984), commanding officer, USS Arthur W. Radford (DD-968), and Commander, Destroyer Squadron 50.

Tidd holds a master's degree in political science from the University of Bordeaux, France, earned as an Olmsted Foundation Scholar. He is a graduate of the Armed Forces Staff College, and was a Federal Executive Fellow at the Atlantic Council of the United States. He is a French linguist and a subspecialist in Strategic Planning and Europe/Russia area studies.

== Awards and decorations ==

Surface Warfare Officer Pin
Defense Distinguished Service Medal w/ 2 bronze oak leaf cluster	Navy Distinguished Service Medal	Defense Superior Service Medal
Legion of Merit w/ 3 gold award stars	Defense Meritorious Service Medal	Meritorious Service Medal w/ 2 award stars
Navy and Marine Corps Commendation Medal w/ 3 award stars	Joint Meritorious Unit Award	Navy Unit Commendation with 2 bronze service stars
Navy "E" Ribbon with Battle E device	Navy Expeditionary Medal with 2 service stars	National Defense Service Medal with 2 service stars
Armed Forces Expeditionary Medal with 2 service stars	Iraq Campaign Medal	Global War on Terrorism Expeditionary Medal
Global War on Terrorism Service Medal	Navy Sea Service Deployment Ribbon with 4 service stars	Navy and Marine Corps Overseas Service Ribbon with 1 silver service star
National Order of the Legion of Honour (Knight) (France)	Navy Expert Rifleman Medal	Navy Expert Pistol Shot Medal
United States Southern Command Badge
Presidential Service Badge

Military offices
Preceded by Victor G. Guillory	Commander of United States Naval Forces Southern Command; 2011-2012	Succeeded by Sinclair M. Harris
Preceded by Victor G. Guillory	Commander of the United States Fourth Fleet; 2011-2012	Succeeded by Sinclair M. Harris
Preceded by Robert Neller	Director for Operations of the Joint Staff; 2012-2013	Succeeded by William C. Mayville Jr.
Preceded by Harry B. Harris Jr.	Assistant to the Chairman of the Joint Chiefs of Staff; 2013-2015	Succeeded by Frank Craig Pandolfe
Preceded by John F. Kelly	Commander of the United States Southern Command; 2016–2018	Succeeded by Craig S. Faller
