= Chaplain of the United States Coast Guard =

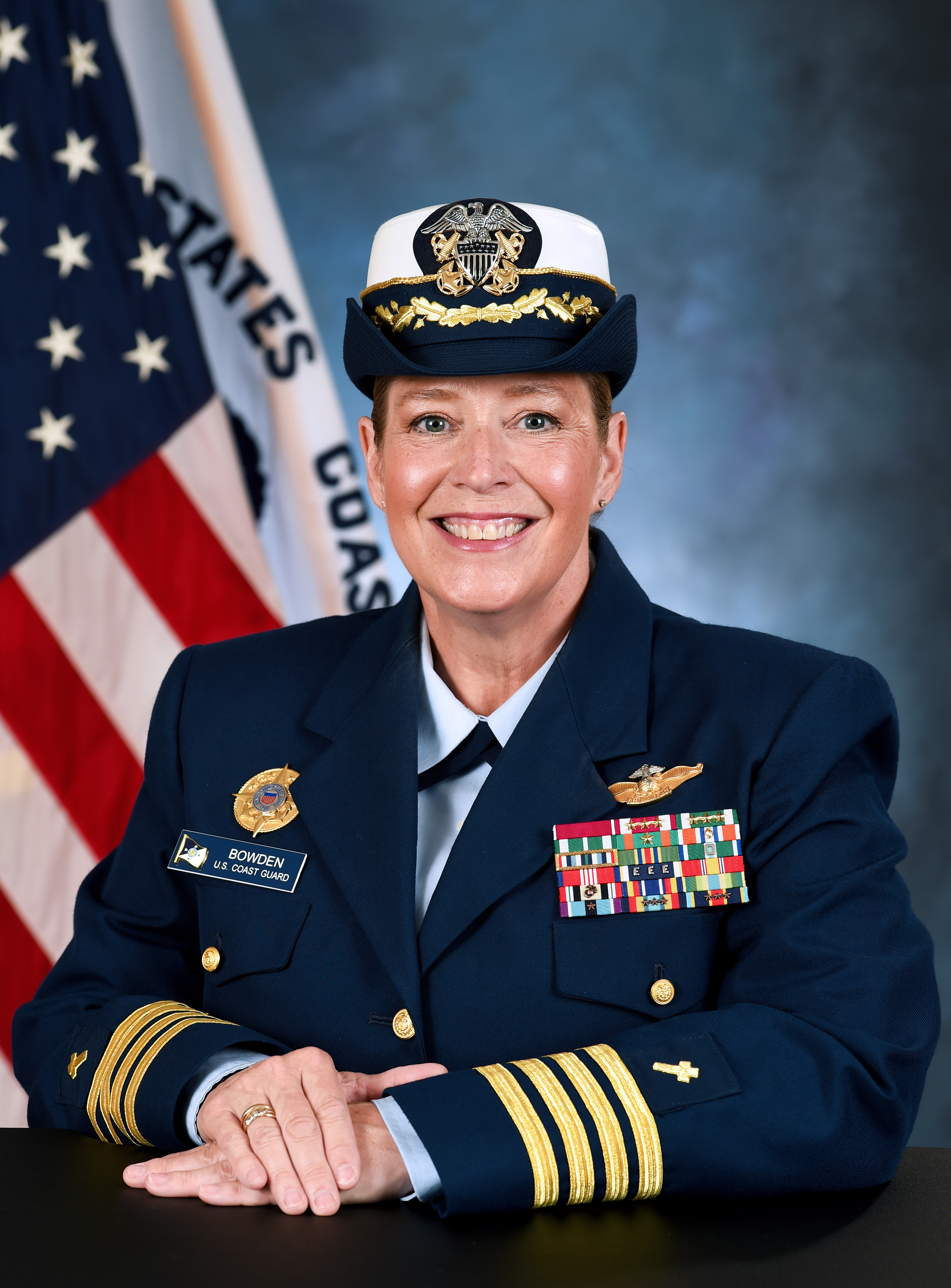
- Incumbent; CAPT Jennifer Bowden since July 2024
- Formation: 1983
- Website: Official website

The chaplain of the United States Coast Guard (COCG) is the senior chaplain of the United States Coast Guard (USCG) and is attached to USCG headquarters in Washington, D.C., as a United States Navy Chaplain Corps officer who reports directly to the commandant of the Coast Guard. The current chaplain of the Coast Guard is Captain Jennifer Bowden.

== Purpose ==
The chaplain of the Coast Guard serves as the commandant's senior advisor on matters pertaining to chaplains and the free exercise of religion as enshrined in First Amendment to the United States Constitution as exercised by USCG personnel and their eligible family members. Chaplains provide religious ministry, advocate for and promote the well-being of USCG personnel, and serve as command liaison officers to civilian religious leaders, communities, organizations and agencies. The duties of the office are described in the Commandant's Religious Ministries in the Coast Guard instruction.

The USCG does not have an organic chaplain corps; chaplains from the United States Navy Chaplain Corps are assigned to the USCG to serve in USCG billets. Traditionally, documents such as the USCG Chaplains Orientation Manual provided guidance for Navy chaplains assigned to USCG duties. Chaplains are clergy who hail from many different faiths and denominations and may be ordained or appointed as ministers, priests, imams, and rabbis by their denomination.

== U.S. Coast Guard chaplains ==
	Name	Photo	Term began	Term ended
1.	CAPT Eddy B. Moran		1983	1986
2.	CAPT Richard A. Plishker		1986	1989
3.	CAPT James G. Goode		1989	1992
4.	CAPT Thomas K. Chadwick		1992	1995
5.	CAPT Skip Blancett		1995	1998
6.	CAPT Leroy Gilbert		1998	2002
7.	CAPT Wilbur C. Douglass, III		2002	2006
8.	CAPT William F. Cuddy Jr.		2006	2010
9.	CAPT Gary P. Weeden		June 11, 2010	March 2014
10.	CAPT Gregory N. Todd		June 23, 2014	April 12, 2018
11.	CAPT Thomas J. Walcott		April 12, 2018	April 20, 2022
12.	CAPT Daniel L. Mode		April 20, 2022	April 24, 2024
13.	CAPT Jennifer D. Bowden		July 2024	Incumbent

== See also ==
- United States military chaplains
- Chiefs of Chaplains of the United States
- Chaplain's Medal for Heroism
- Armed Forces Chaplains Board
- Chief of Chaplains of the United States Navy
- United States Navy Chaplain Corps
- Badges of the United States Coast Guard
- United States Coast Guard
