= Arlington Heights High School =

School in Fort Worth, Texas, United States

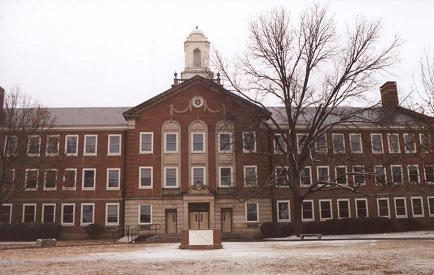

Location
- 4501 West Freeway; Fort Worth, Texas 76107; United States; 32°43′55″N 97°23′9″W

Information
- School type: Public secondary
- Established: 1920
- School district: Fort Worth Independent School District
- Principal: Chris Bibb
- Teaching staff: 118.59 (FTE)
- Grades: 9–12
- Enrollment: 1,898 (2025-2026)
- Student to teacher ratio: 16.00
- Campus: Urban
- Colors: Blue and gold
- Athletics conference: University Interscholastic League 5A
- Nickname: Heights
- Rival: Paschal High School
- Newspaper: Jacket Journal
- Website: School website

Arlington Heights High School (AHHS, Heights) is a secondary school located in Fort Worth, Texas, United States. The school serves grades 9 through 12, and is a part of the Fort Worth Independent School District. Its mascot is the Yellow Jacket and its colors are blue and gold.

Arlington Heights High School serves western portions of Fort Worth including the Como, Arlington Heights, Ridglea, Meadows West and Rivercrest neighborhoods, as well as the city of Westover Hills.

== History ==
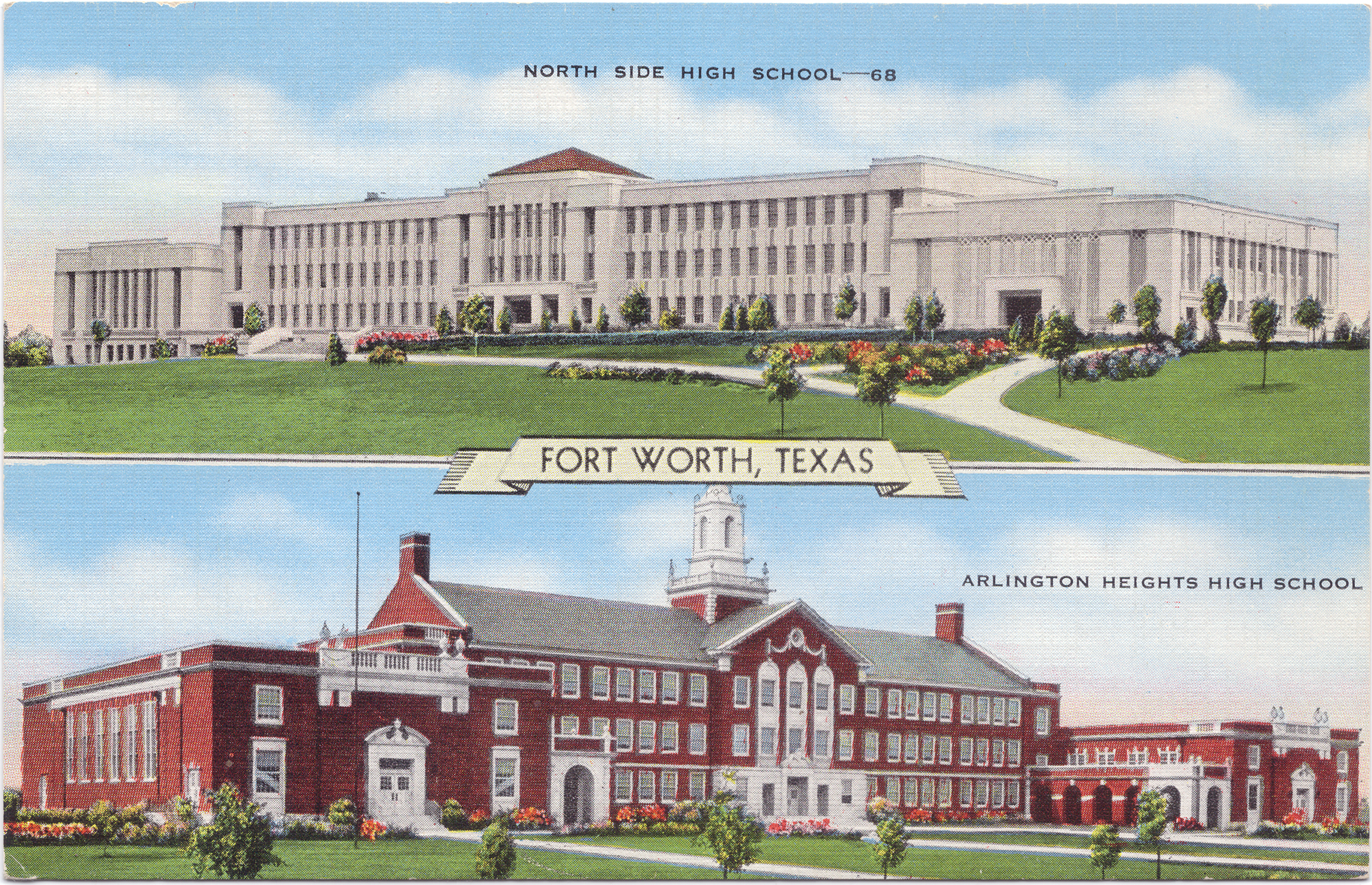
Postcard of Arlington Heights High School (bottom) and North Side High School, undated

Arlington Heights High School was established in 1922 and hosted 715 students in its inaugural year. The current building was built in 1937 based on a design by Preston Geren Sr. Students from the area had previously attended Stripling High School, which is now a feeder middle school.

Arlington Heights was generally affluent and White until the late 1960s. Black students at the time attended Como High School, which no longer exists and was merged with Arlington Heights at its closing.

In 1968, Western Hills High School was hosted in temporary buildings at Arlington Heights until its campus opened in 1969 on a 25-acre tract in West Fort Worth at 3600 Boston Avenue.

As of 1996, students could be bused to AHHS from the Butler subsidized housing in downtown Fort Worth and from various communities in southeast Fort Worth with racial and ethnic minorities.

Students at Arlington Heights refer to their school as "The Hill", as the main building offers a view of the Trinity River valley to the south, from which AHHS is visible.

In 1996, the Fort Worth Star-Telegram called the school a "scholastically touted institution that draws students from private schools."

== Description ==
The school occupies a red brick building visible from Interstate 30 (West Freeway).

The main building houses 74 classrooms, a library, band hall, auditorium, gymnasium, workrooms and administrative offices. Outside buildings include a cafeteria, second gymnasium, field houses with concessions stands and a weight room. A new wing opened in the fall of 2004 and houses six classrooms and a state of-the-art dance studio. A detached cafeteria with outside seating was built and opened in 2019. The surrounding grounds are covered with tennis courts, baseball, softball, a unique multi-purpose athletic facility, soccer and football fields and an all-weather track that is open for public use.

== Student body ==
In the 2025-2026 school year there were 1,898 students and 118.59 teachers with a student-teacher ratio of 16.00. 962 students were Hispanic, 470 students were African American, 382 students were White, 66 students were two races or more, 15 students were Asian, and 3 students were American Indian/Alaskan Native. 963 students were Male while 935 were Female. A total of 1,287 students were eligible to participate in the National School Lunch Program, with 1,267 qualifying for free lunches and 20 for price-reduced lunches.

Arlington Heights Highschool competes in the University Interscholastic League (UIL) Class 5A classification. The school fields teams in 11 varsity sports, alongside an academic competition program.

UIL sponsored programs include:

- Baseball
- Basketball
- Cross Country
- Football
- Golf
- Soccer
- Softball
- Swimming and Diving
- Team Tennis
- Volleyball
- Wrestling
- UIL Academics

== Notable incidents ==
In 1963, a number of Paschal High School students attacked a crowd of Arlington Heights students using blunt weapons, Molotov cocktails and a plane that dropped toilet paper with Paschal's school colors. This incident led to 46 arrests, and a Heights High School bonfire being the center of a near riot. In the incident, carloads of Paschal boys and exes descended on a crowd of 500 Heights students at Benbrook Lake with an armory of weapons including baseball bats, lead pipes, whips and Molotov cocktails. A private-plane flyover by a 20-year-old pilot, a 1962 Paschal graduate, dropped rolls of school-color purple-and-white toilet paper that fluttered down onto the Heights crowd, and a 1948 sedan covered in gasoline-soaked mattresses and labeled "The Panther Ram Car" was set afire by a burly graduate and rolled toward the bonfire woodpile. There was also a ground assault by boys with bows and arrows, storming over the spillway and sailing arrows in a scene a county deputy compared to a frontier Native American attack. When all was said and done there was only one injury, when wrecker driver Junior Slayton, 33, was grazed by buckshot while towing away a student's car. One week later, a visiting President John F. Kennedy smiled and asked at the mention of Paschal High School, "Isn't that the school with its own air force?"

In 1979, a Paschal High School student stole a bulldozer from a county construction site and rammed it into the Arlington Heights field house the day before the annual Heights-Eastern Hills football game, destroying the field house. The incident resulted in criminal convictions and a nationwide reassessment of safety and security measures, starting a national discussion about youth violence and vandalism on many television and radio programs.

On February 28th, 2020, at around 12 PM, Arlington Heights was placed under lockdown following the discovery of an unused box of ammunition and a BB gun on school grounds. School administrators and law enforcement investigated and responded by implementing metal detector screenings for students. A thorough search of the premises confirmed that there were no actual firearms present on the campus. No arrests were made, and the lockdown was lifted at the end of the school day.

On August 21st, 2026, at around 8:15 AM, Arlington Heights was placed under lockdown following emergency calls to Fort Worth Police Department regarding potential gunshots inside the building. Campus resource officers, Neighborhood Patrol Officers, and Officers from other parts of the city responded to the campus. A subsequent investigation by law enforcement revealed that the sounds of gunfire were caused by one or more students detonating fireworks in a school bathroom. After confirming there was no active threat, the lockdown was lifted. No injuries were reported, and the identities of the students involved were not immediately released.

== Notable alumni ==
- Michael A. Andrews, United States Representative from Texas (1983–1995)
- Leon Bridges, singer
- Blake Brockermeyer, former NFL player for the Carolina Panthers, Chicago Bears and Denver Broncos, and former Texas Longhorns lineman
- Milton Brown, "father of Western swing"
- Betty Buckley, Tony Award-winning actress and singer
- Tim Curry, Tarrant County district attorney, 1972–2009
- T. Cullen Davis, son of oil tycoon Stinky Davis; accused and acquitted twice for murder at his mansion
- John Denver, folk rock musician
- Willie Flores, United States Coast Guard Medal recipient
- Tony Franklin, former placekicker for the Philadelphia Eagles, New England Patriots and Miami Dolphins
- Pete Geren, United States Representative from Texas (1989–1997) and Secretary of the Army (2007–2009)
- Preston Geren Jr., architect
- Turner Gill, former national champion Nebraska Cornhuskers quarterback; former head football coach at Liberty University and the University of Kansas
- Robert Allen Hale, criminal and self-proclaimed pilgrim of the Alaskan wilderness
- Gunilla Hutton, cast member on Hee Haw and Petticoat Junction
- Martha Hyer, actress nominated for an Academy Award for Best Supporting Actress
- Joe K. Longley, former president of the Texas State Bar
- Delbert McClinton, Grammy Award-winning singer-songwriter and musician
- Ronnie Mills, former swimmer; won gold and bronze medals at the age of 17 at the 1968 Summer Olympics
- Lee Harvey Oswald, assassin of president John F. Kennedy (did not graduate)
- Bill Paxton, actor and film director
- Mike Renfro, former NFL player for the Houston Oilers and Dallas Cowboys; college player at TCU
- Sergio Reyes, former U.S. Olympic boxer
- Chuck Reynolds, football player
- Dusty Rhodes, Hall of Fame professional wrestler, known as "The American Dream"
- A'Shawn Robinson, All-American football player, University of Alabama; former defensive tackle for the Detroit Lions and Los Angeles Rams and former defensive end for the New York Giants, currently a defensive end for the Carolina Panthers
- Tom Schieffer, former U.S. ambassador to Australia and Japan; candidate for Democratic nomination for governor of Texas
- Tommy Thompson, author
- Marc Veasey, congressman
- William Walker, Metropolitan Opera baritone
- Van Williams, actor, The Green Hornet
- Tariq Woolen, NFL player for the Seattle Seahawks, NFL 2022 Pro-Bowler, Pro Football Writers of America All-Rookie Team 2022

== Feeder patterns ==
Students attending the following feeder schools are zoned to attend Arlington Heights High School:

=== Middle schools ===
- W.C. Stripling
- William Monnig

=== Elementary schools ===
- Burton Hill
- Como
- North Hi Mount
- Mary Louise Phillips
- Ridglea Hills
- South Hi Mount

== Rivalries ==
- R. L. Paschal High School, Fort Worth (listed by Texas Football Monthly as the oldest ongoing high-school rivalry in Texas)
- Trimble Tech High School
- Western Hills High School
