= Como, Fort Worth, Texas =

Neighborhood in Fort Worth, Texas

Coordinates: 32.7232°N 97.4038°W

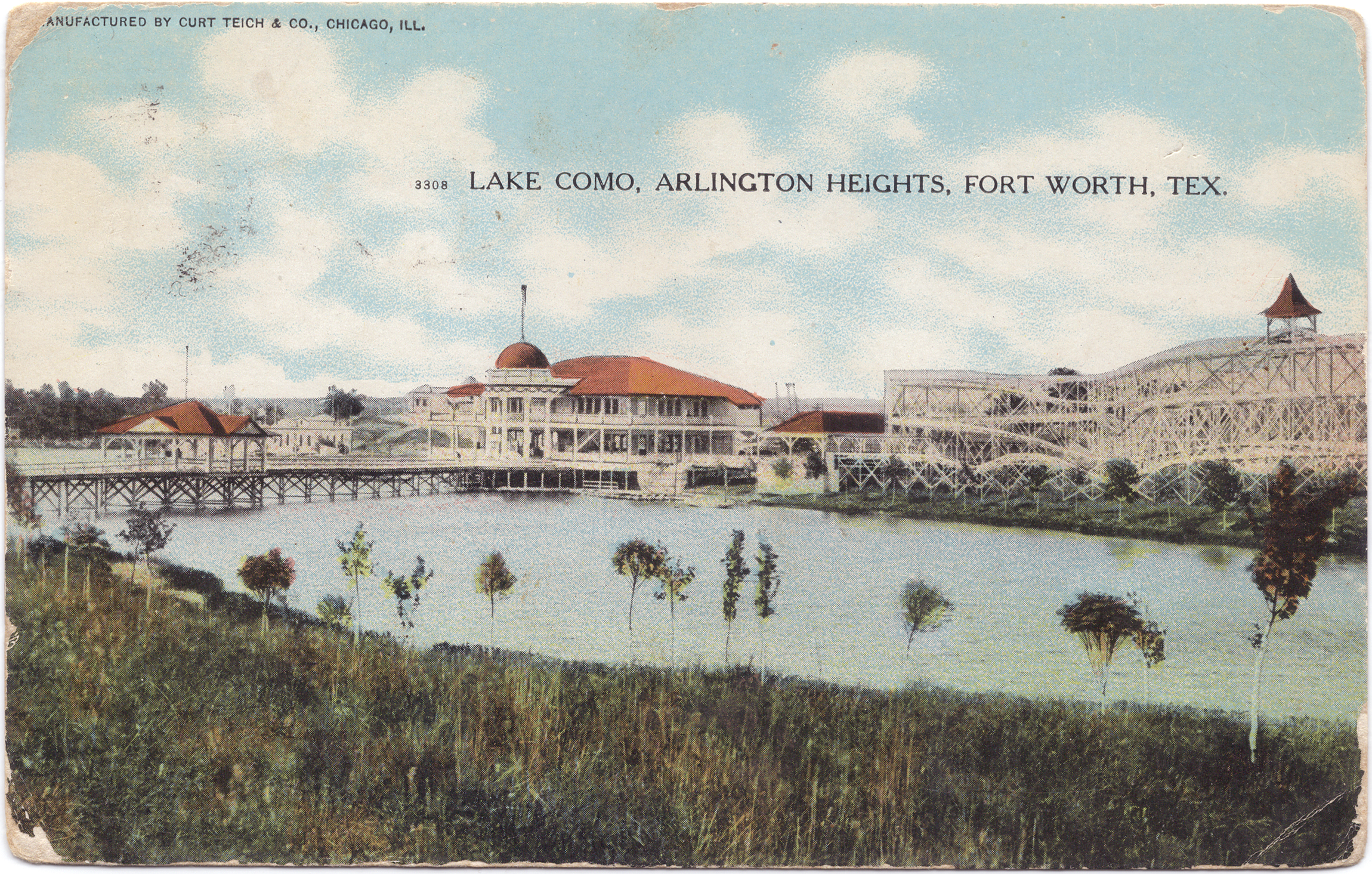
Postcard of Lake Como in Arlington Heights, 1908

The Como neighborhood is a historically African-American neighborhood located on the west side of Fort Worth, Texas. Como was named after Como, Italy. One of its residents was a neighborhood activist Viola Pitts. The Como Lake was built in 1889. Originally the neighborhood was conceived as a resort. In the early 1900s Lillian Russell visited the resort and was impressed by it. The neighborhood newspaper, the Lake Como Weekly, was published under several titles between 1940 and 1986.

In the 1960s through 1990s the community struggled to prosper. However, with the West side of Fort Worth's economic boom, significant infrastructure improvements by the City of Fort Worth, and the efforts of many, the Como neighborhood is making significant strides in becoming a prosperous home for African-Americans, Hispanics, as well as many others.

== Schools ==
=== Elementary ===
- Como Elementary School
- Como Montessori School

=== Middle ===
- Leonard Middle School
- Monnig Middle School

=== High schools ===
- Arlington Heights High School
- Western Hills High School

== See also ==
- List of neighborhoods in Fort Worth, Texas
