= Edgar Culbertson =

United States Coast Guard Boatswain's Mate First Class (1935-1967)

Edgar A. Culbertson
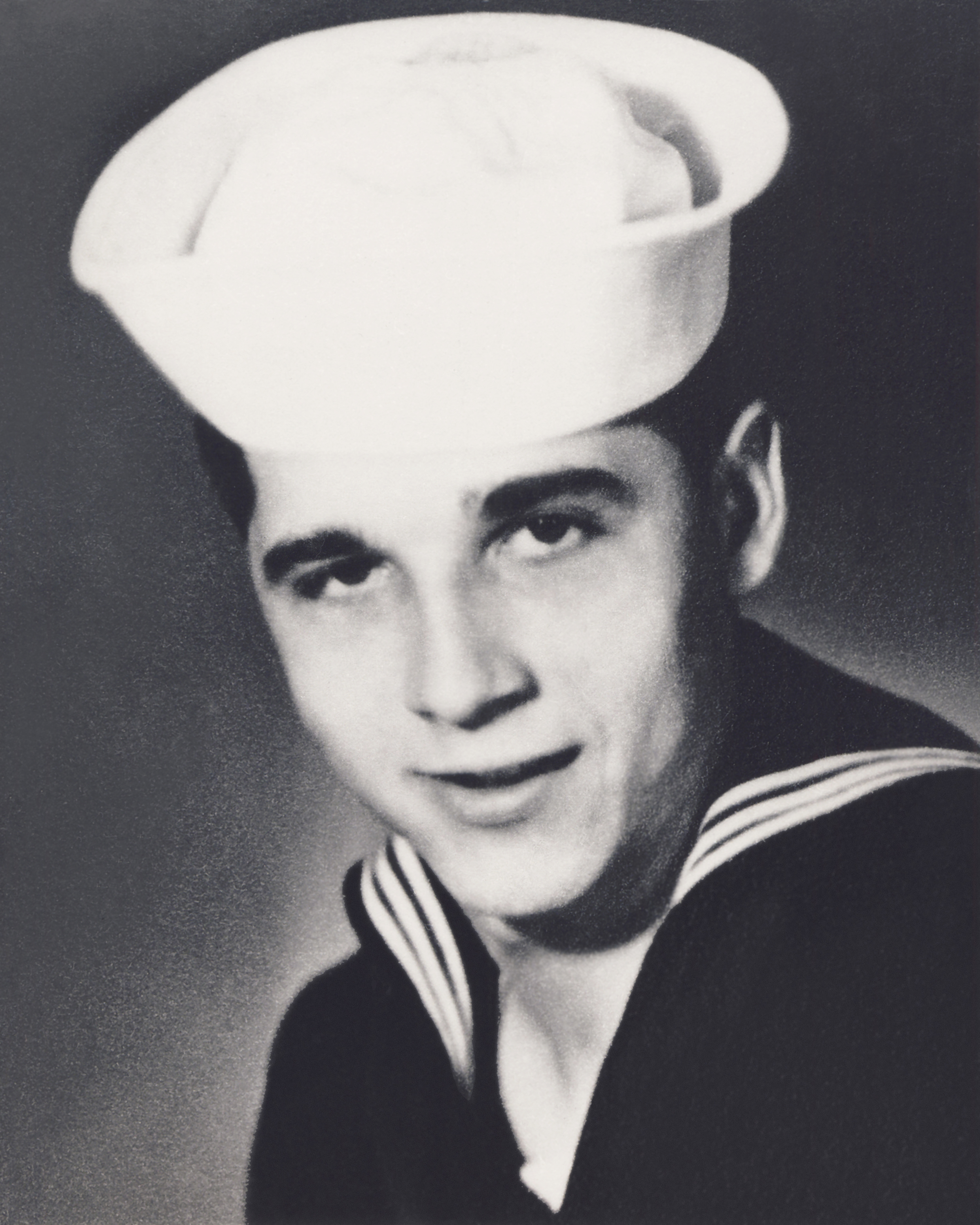
- Edgar Culbertson, Coast Guard Medal recipient
- Born: October 13, 1935; Ferndale, Michigan, U.S.
- Died: April 30, 1967 (aged 31); Duluth, Minnesota, U.S.
- Burial place: Detroit, Michigan
- Military career
- Allegiance: United States of America
- Branch: United States Coast Guard
- Service years: 1952-1967
- Rank: Petty Officer First Class
- Nickname: Ed
- Units: Lifeboat Station Duluth, Lifeboat Station Charlevoix, USS Durant (DER-389)
- Conflicts: Korean War
- Awards: Coast Guard Medal; National Defense Service Medal with 1 bronze service star United Nations Service Medal; Korea Service Medal; Coast Guard Good Conduct Medal with 2 bronze service stars Coast Guard Unit Commendation Ribbon

Edgar A. Culbertson (October 13, 1935 – April 30, 1967) was a United States Coast Guard Boatswain's Mate First Class (BM1) who died while trying to rescue three teenage brothers during a fierce storm in Duluth, Minnesota.

== Rescue ==
Meteorologists and Minnesota residents often refer to April 30, 1967, as "Black Sunday," describing the 1967 Iowa–Minnesota tornado outbreak and heavy wind and rain in Duluth. During the storm, waves on Lake Superior in Duluth were reportedly over 20 feet high with water temperature around 36 degrees. Gale-force winds gusted to 45 mph.

Around 7:45 p.m., a witness reported to the Duluth Police Department that three boys (Eric, Nathan and Arthur Halverson) were at the end of the pier when one was washed into the water by a large wave. The other two were stranded at the end of the pier by high winds and waves. The police department contacted the Coast Guard lifeboat station in Duluth for assistance.

Culbertson was a 31-year-old native of Ferndale, Michigan, a veteran of the Korean War and had served in the Coast Guard since 1952. He and two other Coast Guardsmen, Boatswain's Mate 2nd Class Richard R. Callahan, 21, of Cicero, Illinois and Fireman Ronald C. Prei, 21, of St. Francis, Wisconsin, volunteered to attempt a rescue. After arriving at the pier, they tethered themselves together with a rope, spaced 25 feet apart, and began searching the pier with a lantern. They struggled to the end of the pier, but did not find the missing boys who had already been swept over the side.

As Culbertson, Callahan and Prei returned along the pier, another large wave crashed over the wall, knocking Culbertson over the side. His body was later found on the beach.

A permanent marker honoring Culbertson was placed on the pier by the Lake Superior Maritime Visitor Center near the spot where he perished. He is one of only two Coast Guardsmen to have died in the line of duty while serving in Minnesota on Lake Superior. EN3 Keith Brubaker fell overboard and perished on July 11, 1967, while serving the Coast Guard Station North Superior in Grand Marais, Minnesota.

A bronze plaque erected later in 1967 was removed in the early 1980s when the pier was widened and reinforced. Tom Mackay, then a captain for the Vista Fleet and president of the International Shipmasters Association (ISMA) Twin Ports Lodge #12, realized after the pier improvements were finished that the plaque had not been reinstalled. He rallied the ISMA for assistance and the plaque was found and reinstalled on the new pier.

Culbertson, Callahan and Prei were awarded the Coast Guard Medal, the highest peacetime medal awarded in recognition of heroism. At the time, it had only been awarded to 44 people.

=== Coast Guard Medal citation ===
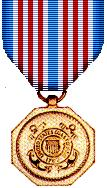

For heroism on the evening of April 30, 1967 while engaged in searching for two teen-age boys reportedly stranded at the Duluth Entry North Breakwater Light, Minnesota. Twin 16-year-old boys and a 17-year-old brother had been seen running along the jetty challenging the 10- to 15-foot waves when witnesses observed a huge wave sweep one boy into the water. When two boys were reported stranded at the light, Petty Officer CULBERTSON and two comrades volunteered to attempt the rescue. Lashing themselves together, the three men proceeded, with hand lanterns as the only illumination, to the end of the breakwater. Despite the high waves, winds gusting to 40 knots, driving rain and 36-degree water, the rescue party diligently searched the breakwater and light but found no trace of the boys. While returning to the beach a 20-foot wave swept Petty Officer CULBERTSON off his feet and hurled him up to and over the breakwater parapet into the sea. Despite the strenuous efforts of his teammates, Petty Officer CULBERTSON perished in this gallant rescue attempt. His outstanding courage, intrepidity, initiative, and unselfish actions were in keeping with the highest traditions of the United States Coast Guard.

== Legacy ==
=== National Law Enforcement Officers Memorial ===
Petty Officer Edgar Culbertson has been selected for inclusion on the National Law Enforcement Officers Memorial in Washington, DC during National Police Week in May 2010. Culbertson will be the 17th member of the United States Coast Guard to receive this honor.

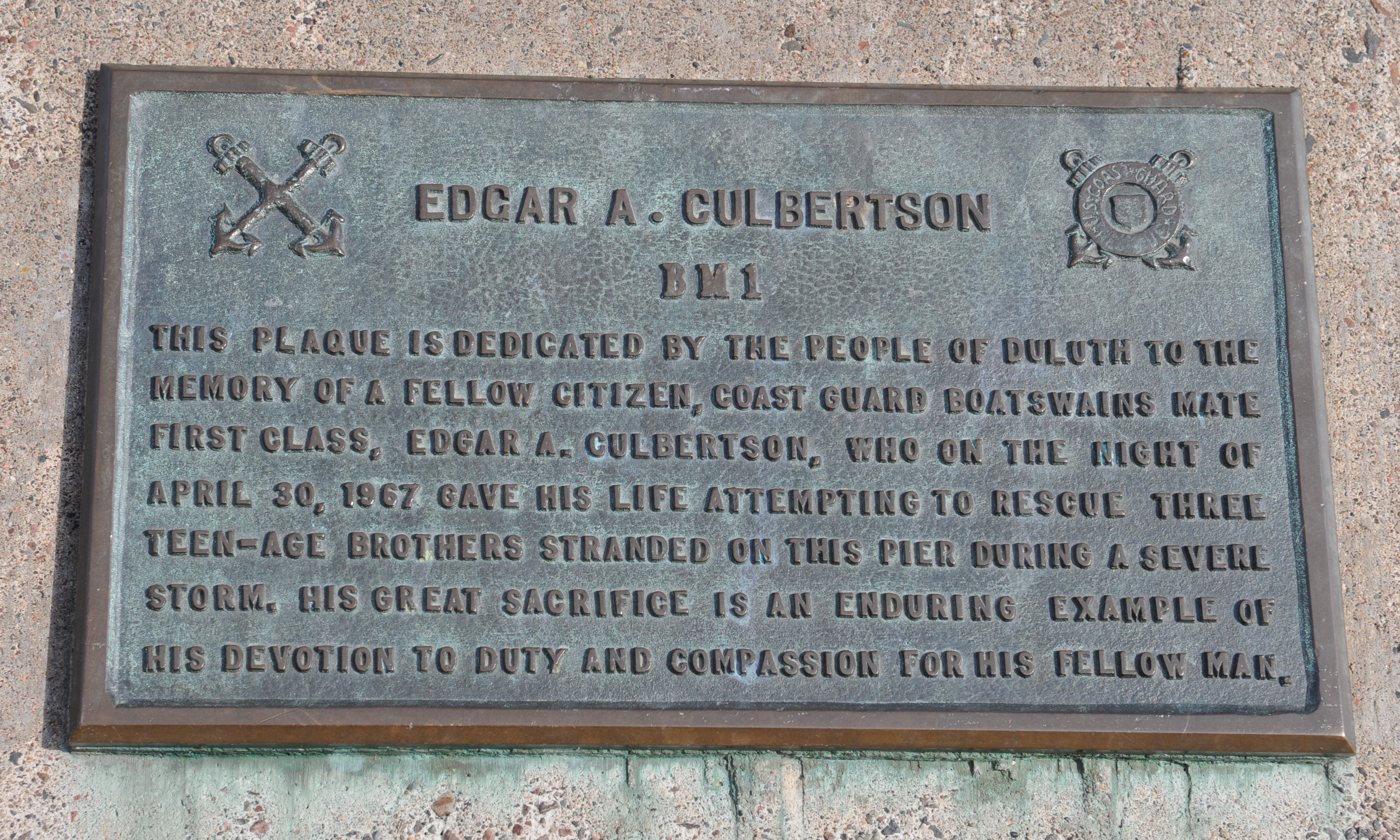
Edgar Culbertson plaque

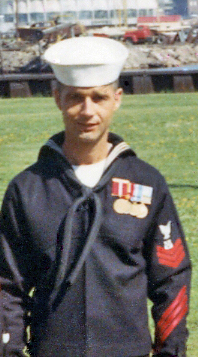
BM1 Culbertson - Lifeboat Station Duluth

=== Namesake of a Coast Guard cutter ===
On December 12, 2017, the Coast Guard announced that it planned to name its 37th Sentinel class cutter the USCGC Edgar Culbertson.
