= Richard Callahan =

Richard Callahan may refer to:

- Richard R. Callahan (1947–1967), awarded the Coast Guard Medal
- Richard G. Callahan (born 1947), American attorney

== See also ==
- Richard Callaghan, American figure skating coach
