= Joe K. Longley =

American lawyer

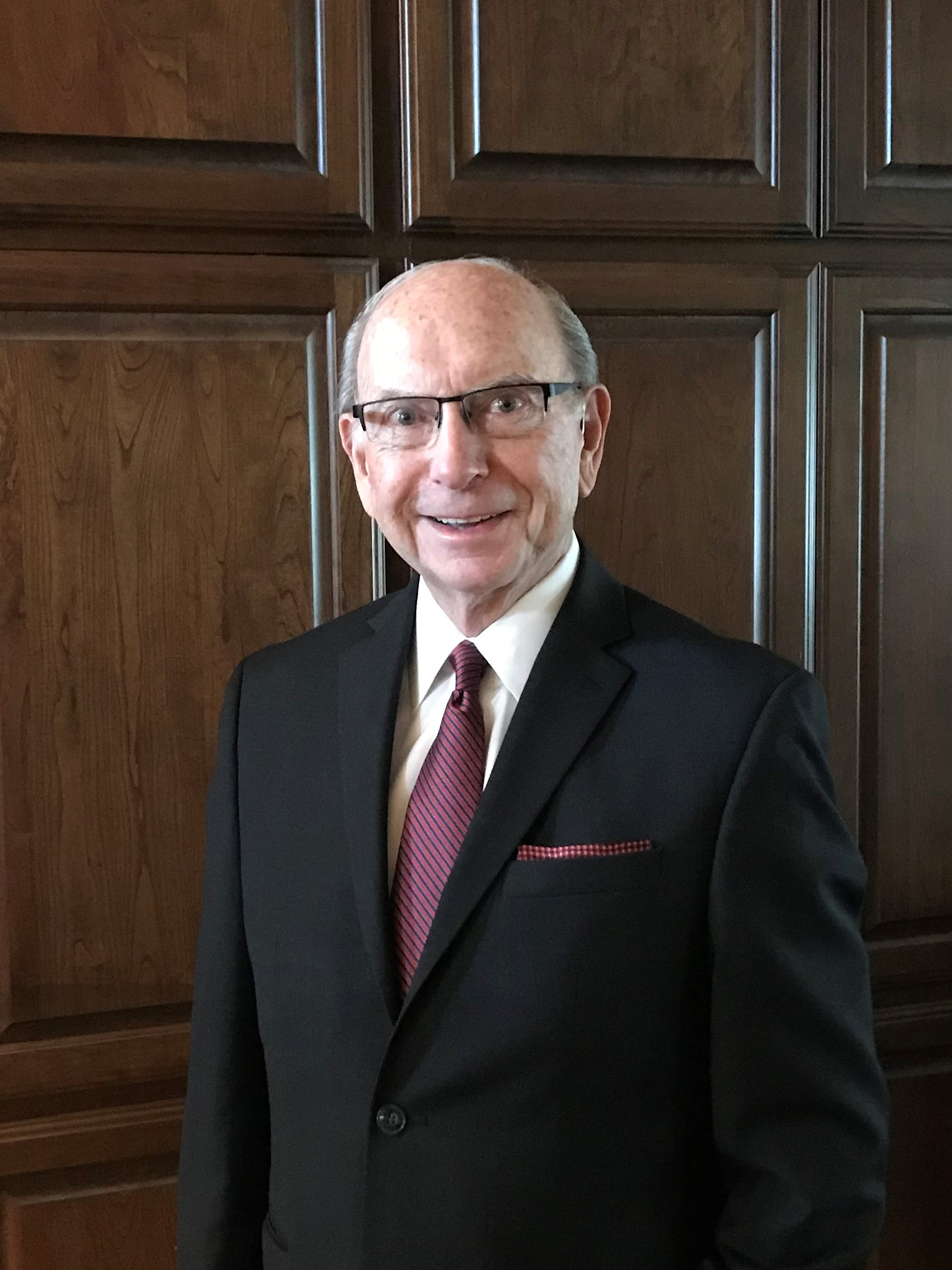
- Joe Longley, State Bar of Texas.
- Born: February 10, 1943 (age 83)
- Education: University of Texas
- Occupation: Lawyer
- Title: President of the Texas State Bar (2018)
- Website: www.joelongley.com

Joe K. Longley (born February 10, 1943) is an American lawyer. He was the first Chief of the Antitrust and Consumer Protection Division of the Texas Attorney General’s Office in 1973, and in 1979 was cofounder of the law firm Longley & Maxwell, LLP. In 2018 he became the President of the Texas State Bar.

== Early life ==
Longley was born on February 10, 1943. After graduating from Arlington Heights High School in Fort Worth, Texas, Joe K. Longley graduated from the University of Texas law school in 1969. He was admitted to the State Bar of Texas the same year. Following law school he worked in the consumer protection office of the Attorney General, before becoming an attorney with Edwards and DeAnda in Corpus Christi, Texas. As of the early 1970s, Longley had become a solo practitioner, working out of Austin, Texas. During this time his work included unpaid lobbying for the Texas Consumers Association.

== Career ==
Longley was on the campaign team for John Hill during his successful campaign to become the Attorney General of Texas. In 1973, Longley became the first Chief of the Antitrust and Consumer Protection Division of the Texas Attorney General’s Office, where he also drafted the Texas Consumer Protection Act and Deceptive Trade Practices Act. He then cofounded the Austin law firm Longley & Maxwell, LLP in 1979 with Philip Maxwell. He returned to solo practice in the mid-2000s, where he continued to work on class action cases in Texas, Arkansas, California, and Oklahoma.

== Presidency of the State Bar of Texas ==
Longley was sworn in as the 138th President of the State Bar of Texas in 2018. He was the first petition-nominated candidate to win the state-wide ballot. After his term elapsed, he became the Immediate Past President of the State Bar of Texas. Longley then authored the book How We Did It .... 2016-2019, which records his experience in reforming the State Bar both during his term and afterwards.

== Film industry ==
Longley was an investor and a completion producer for the 1974 film The Texas Chain Saw Massacre through a small group of investors, they called P.I.T.S., an acronym standing for “Pie in the Sky”. In the years since the film’s success, Longley has stated that he and his friends thought the film would flop, allowing them to take a tax write-off on the movie, and were caught off-guard by the film’s success. In exchange for the investment, the group owned 19% of Vortex/Henkel/Hooper Production, the film’s production company. Following its release, the court assigned Longley as a special master to retrieve the distribution rights from a former partner, before being replaced by a trustee. As an actor, Longley has received credits for the 1981 film Raggedy Man and 1987’s Red Headed Stranger.
