= Western Hills High School (Benbrook, Texas) =

Location
- 3600 Boston Avenue; Benbrook, Texas 76116; United States; 32.719°N 97.455°W

Information
- Type: Public High School
- Established: 1968
- School district: Fort Worth Independent School District
- CEEB code: 442575
- Teaching staff: 69.37 (FTE)
- Grades: 9-12
- Enrollment: 889 (2023–2024)
- Student to teacher ratio: 12.82
- Campus size: 25 acres
- Campus type: Urban/Suburban
- Colors: Forest Green & Gold
- Athletics: UIL Class 4A
- Sports: tennis, Marching Band, football, men's basketball, women's basketball, baseball, softball, men's track & field, men's and women's soccer, swimming & diving, wrestling,
- Nickname: Cougars
- Rival: Benbrook Middle-High School, Benbrook, Texas
- Newspaper: The Mountain Line
- Yearbook: The Catamount
- Feeder schools: Leonard Middle School and Benbrook Middle School
- Website: westernhills.fwisd.org

Western Hills High School (WHHS) is a secondary school located in Benbrook, Texas, United States, serving the city of Benbrook, portions of western Fort Worth, and unincorporated portions of southwestern Tarrant County. The school, which serves grades 9 through 12, is a part of the Fort Worth Independent School District (FWISD).

== History ==
The Western Hills community encompasses the urban area surrounding the school, the Benbrook city area, southwest Fort Worth, and the rural section west to the Tarrant County line. The city of Benbrook school system once served students in Benbrook and surrounding rural areas. In 1954, all Benbrook students above the sixth grade were transferred to the Fort Worth ISD. In 1962, the Benbrook School District was consolidated into the Fort Worth system, busing the high school students to North Side High School or Arlington Heights High School and its junior high schools to J.P. Elder or William Monnig Junior High. Western Hills was first opened on the campus of Arlington Heights High School, in the fall of 1968 with around 800 students crowded into thirteen temporary buildings. In January 1969, this student body moved into its new home, on the 25-acre tract in West Fort Worth at 3600 Boston Avenue.

The creation of General Dynamics Fort Worth Division in nearby White Settlement spurred an increased enrollment from the original 714 to 2,243 in 1972. At that time the student body was housed not only in the main building with one level but also in 23 portable buildings. With a decreasing student enrollment of 2,052 in the fall of 1980, the school building was expanded to two floors and eliminated the portable buildings.

On October 23, 1989, a briefcase containing a firebomb was found. During an attempt to disarm the device, it exploded, causing mostly smoke damage and no injuries. In 1991, the decline of student enrollment had tapered off to 1,503, reflecting of job losses from the sale of General Dynamics' Fort Worth division to Lockheed.

Circa 2010, school enrollment has ranged between 1,461 and 1,503. Recently, 14 portable buildings have been added to the campus.

== Spirit ==
The school mascot is the cougar. Official school colors are forest green and gold and throwback colors reflecting early years are yellow and green.

The WHHS student newspaper is The Mountain Line, (a cougar is also known as a mountain lion) begun in the spring of 1970. The paper won the best-in-city award in its first year in a contest sponsored by the Fort Worth press.

Western Hills High School's school annual yearbook is named The Catamount. The name was chosen by the new school's annual staff after suggestions made by annual staff members.

== Feeder patterns ==
=== Elementary ===
- Luella Merrett Elementary
- Waverly Park Elementary
- Western Hills Elementary
- Western Hills Primary

=== Middle school ===
- Leonard Middle School
- Applied Learning Academy

== Academics ==
=== Languages ===
WHHS offers classes in American Sign Language, French, and Spanish.

== Sports ==
WHHS currently competes as a University Interscholastic League Class 4A school.

=== Baseball ===
In 2001 Western Hills won the Texas Class 4A State baseball championship.

=== Football ===
The Cougars' home games are usually played in the FWISD's Farrington Field, but the team also frequently plays in Herman Clark Stadium and Scarborough-Handley Field when facing opponents that also belong to the school district.

In its inaugural year, the school's football team lost every game. The school years 1969 and 1970 saw the school's football team make a complete turn around and go on to win bi-district both years.

==== Playoff appearances ====
The Cougars have competed in the post-season playoffs toward the state title fifteen times, advancing to the second round three times. They have never advanced beyond the second round.

Year	Class	Division	Round	W/L	Opponent	PF	PA
1969	4A		Bi-district	W	Fort Worth O.D. Wyatt Chaparrals	28	7
1969	4A		Regional	L	Dallas Woodrow Wilson Wildcats	20	48
1970	4A		Bi-district	L	Fort Worth I.M. Terrell Panthers	8	9
1982	5A		Bi-district	W	Wichita Falls S.H. Rider Raiders	14	6
1982	5A		Area	L	Hurst L.D. Bell Blue Raiders	7	23
1985	5A		Bi-district	L	Wichita Falls Coyotes	20	21
1990	5A	Big school	Bi-district	L	Arlington Colts	29	40
1991	5A	Division 1	Bi-district	L	Arlington Sam Houston Texans	34	45
1992	5A	Division 1	Bi-district	L	Euless Trinity Trojans	6	35
1993	5A	Division 2	Bi-district	L	Haltom City Haltom Buffaloes	12	30
1996	4A	Division 1	Bi-district	W	Weatherford Kangaroos	24	22
1996	4A	Division 1	Regional	L	Azle Hornets	14	24
1997	4A	Division 1	Bi-district	L	Brownwood Lions	7	48
2000	4A	Division 2	Bi-district	L	Stephenville Yellow Jackets	43	45
2002	4A	Division 2	Bi-district	L	Stephenville Yellow Jackets	45	63
2003	4A	Division 2	Bi-district	L	Aledo Bearcats	26	52
2005	4A	Division 2	Bi-district	L	Springtown Porcupines	27	35
2010	4A	Division 1	Bi-district	L	North Richland Hills Birdville Hawks	3	41

=== Wrestling ===
Western Hills was only one of six schools in FWISD to have a wrestling team.

== Notable people ==
- Terry Pierce — American football linebacker at Kansas State; played in the NFL with the Denver Broncos and the Houston Texans
- Todd Oldham — internationally recognized fashion designer and TV fashion host for MTV, graduated from Fort Worth, Texas' Western Hills High School in 1980
- William Flores — recipient of the Coast Guard Medal for valor in the Coast Guard's worst peacetime accident in history; namesake for the third US Coast Guard Sentinel-class Fast Response Cutter USCGC William Flores (WPC-1103); recipient of the Texas Legislative Medal of Honor
- Vaden Todd Lewis — guitarist, vocalist for Toadies
