= USCGC Edgar Culbertson =

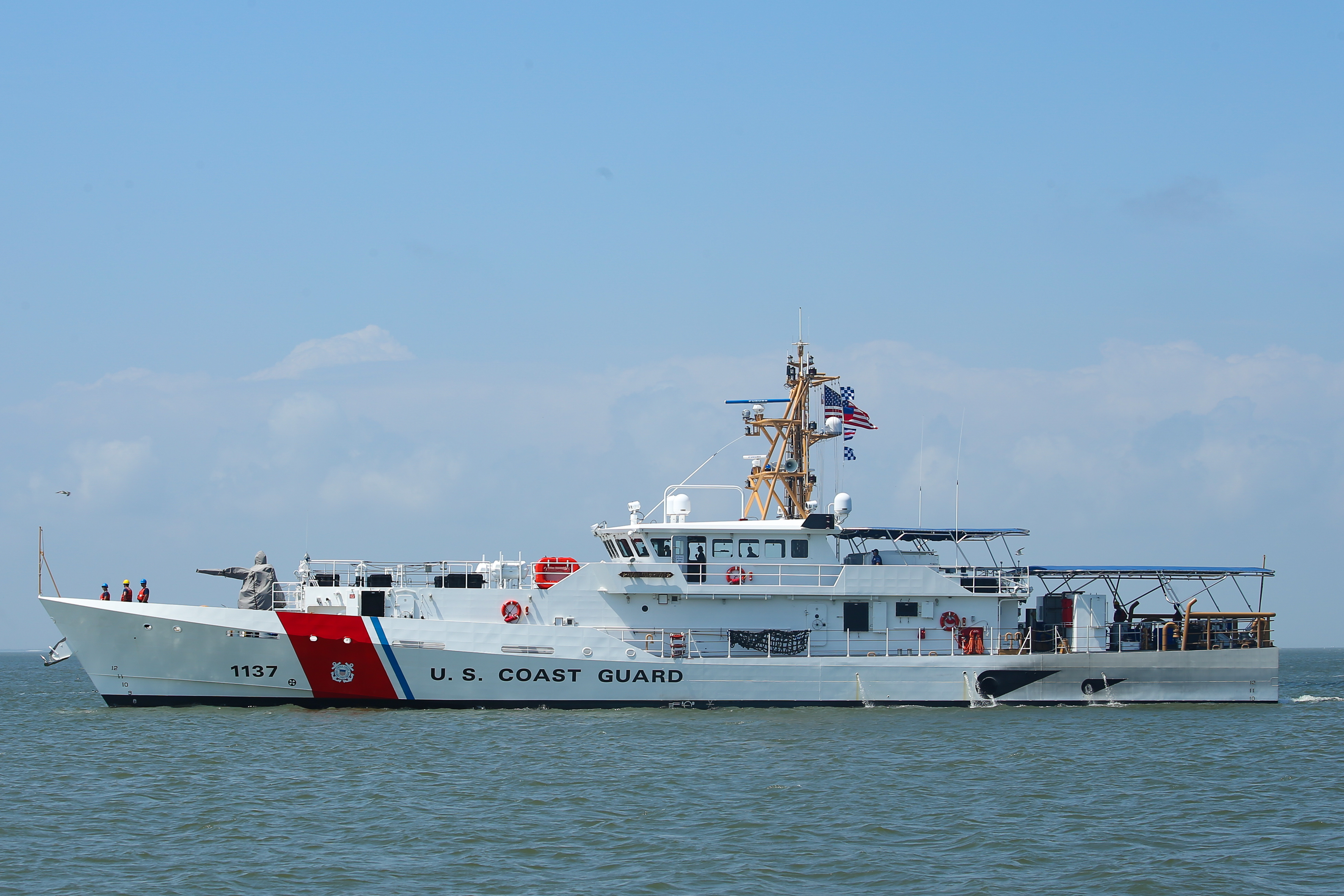

History

United States
- Name: Edgar Culbertson
- Namesake: Edgar Culbertson
- Operator: United States Coast Guard
- Builder: Bollinger Shipyards, Lockport, Louisiana
- Launched: February 6, 2020
- Acquired: February 6, 2020
- Commissioned: June 11, 2020
- Home port: Galveston
- Identification: Hull number: WPC-1137; MMSI number: 338926437; Callsign: NECN
- Motto: Braving the Storm
- Status: in active service
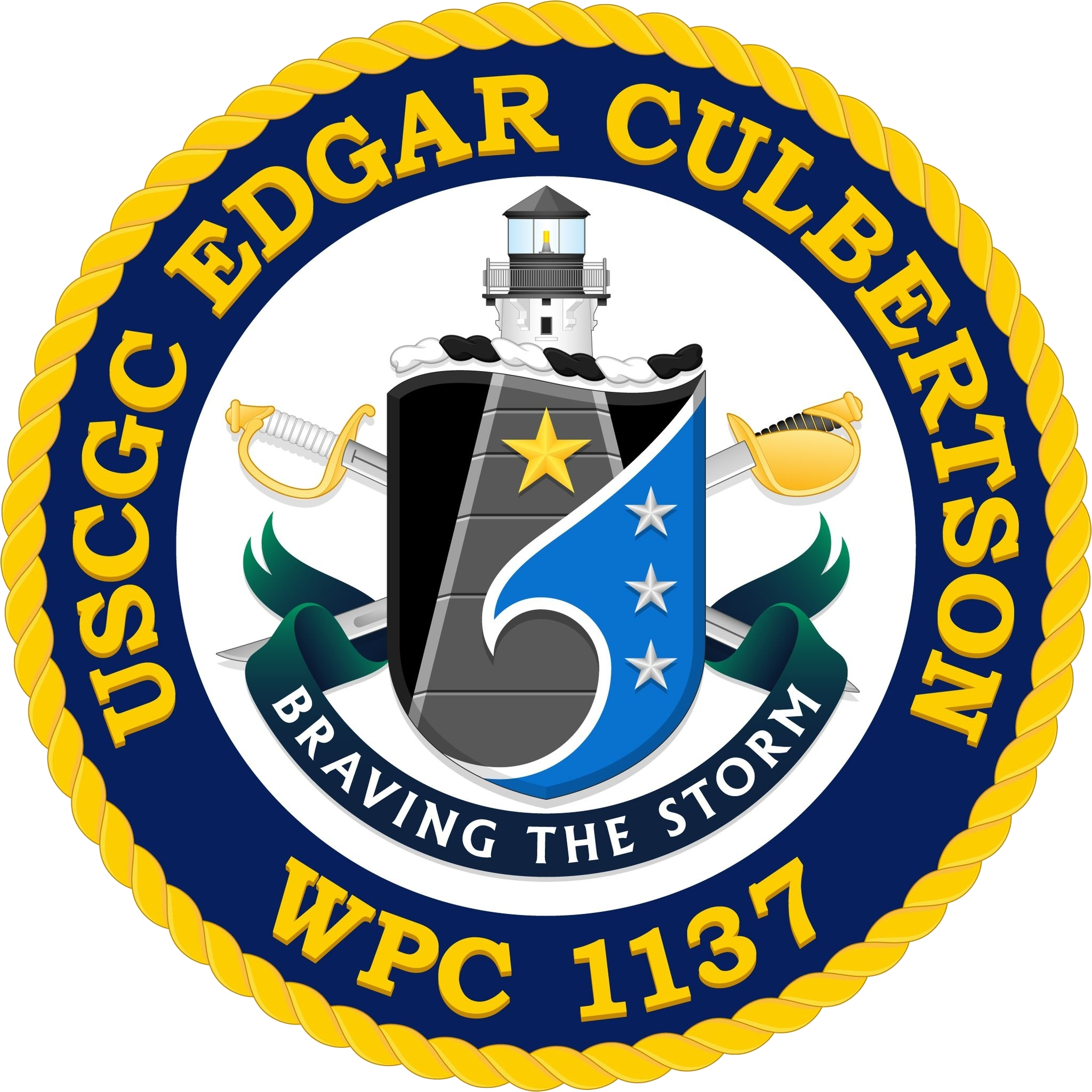
- Badge

General characteristics
- Class & type: Sentinel-class cutter
- Displacement: 353 long tons (359 t)
- Length: 46.8 m (153 ft 7 in)
- Beam: 8.11 m (26 ft 7 in)
- Depth: 2.9 m (9 ft 6 in)
- Propulsion: 2 × 4,300 kW (5,800 shp); 1 × 75 kW (101 shp) bow thruster
- Speed: 28 knots (52 km/h; 32 mph)
- Range: 2,500 nautical miles (4,600 km; 2,900 mi)
- Endurance: 5 days
- Boats & landing craft carried: 1 × Cutter Boat - Over the Horizon Interceptor
- Complement: 4 officers, 20 crew
- Sensors & processing systems: L-3 C4ISR suite
- Armament: 1 × Mk 38 Mod 2 25 mm automatic gun; 4 × crew-served Browning M2 machine guns
- Notes: First Commanding Officer LT Katie Shveda

USCGC Edgar Culbertson (WPC-1137) is the United States Coast Guard's 37th Sentinel-class cutter, and the second of three to be homeported in Galveston, Texas.

== Design ==
Like her sister ships, Edgar Culbertson is designed to perform search and rescue missions, port security, and the interception of smugglers. She is armed with a remotely-controlled, gyro-stabilized 25 mm autocannon, four crew served M2 Browning machine guns, and light arms. She is equipped with a stern launching ramp, that allows her to launch or retrieve a water-jet propelled high-speed auxiliary boat, without first coming to a stop. Her high-speed boat has over-the-horizon capability, and is useful for inspecting other vessels, and deploying boarding parties.

The crew's drinking water needs are met through a desalination unit. The crew mess is equipped with a television with satellite reception.

== Operational career ==
Edgar Culbertson was delivered to the Coast Guard, for her acceptance trials, in Key West, on February 6, 2020. She arrived at her homeport of Galveston, Texas on March 23, 2020. Edgar Culbertson was commissioned in Galveston on June 11, 2020.

== Namesake ==
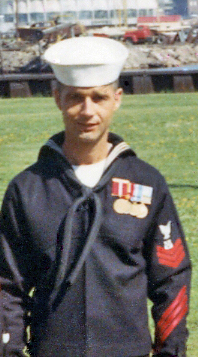
Ed Culbertson, Boatswain's Mate First Class (BM1), USCG

In 2010, Charles "Skip" W. Bowen, who was then the United States Coast Guard's most senior non-commissioned officer, proposed that all 58 cutters in the Sentinel class should be named after enlisted sailors in the Coast Guard, or one of its precursor services, who were recognized for their heroism. The Coast Guard chose Edgar Culbertson as the namesake of the 37th cutter. Culbertson and two other Coast Guard sailors saw three teenage boys at the end of a long pier, on Lake Superior, when a storm had whipped up 20 feet (6.1 m) waves. They saw a wave wash one boy off the pier, and saw the other boys pinned by the extremity of the weather. Culbertson and his comrades ventured out onto the pier to rescue the boys, and Culbertson himself was washed away.
