= Viola Pitts =

- Born: September 8, 1914
- Died: April 15, 2004 (aged 89)
- Known for: Activism

Viola Marie Hamilton Pitts (September 8, 1914 – April 15, 2004) was a Fort Worth, Texas community activist who advocated for her neighborhood of Como, located on Fort Worth's west side. Pitts was often described as a fiery and effective activist. She helped Como receive better funding for the community center, elementary school, and streets.

She was also active in Democratic politics, and candidates she endorsed were supported by a very powerful bloc of voters.

In 2000 she was honored when an outlying hospital clinic was renamed the Viola Pitts/Como Health Center. When she died she received a letter of tribute from Bill Clinton and a commendation on the House floor from congressman Martin Frost.
