= David M. Lorange =

- Military career
- Allegiance: United States of America
- Branch: United States Coast Guard
- Rank: Boatswain’s Mate Second Class
- Awards: Coast Guard Medal

Coast Guardsman - Boatswain Mate Second Class (BM2) David M. Lorange was awarded the Coast Guard Medal for extraordinary heroism during the rescue of a young boy near the Coast Guard station at Saipan.

== Coast Guard Medal Citation ==
Date of Action: 19 March 1979 Date of Award: 21 June 1979

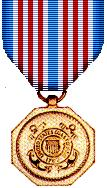

Petty Officer LORANGE is cited for extraordinary heroism on the afternoon of 19 March 1979 when he rescued a young boy from drowning in the turbulent surf at Agingan Point, Saipan, Northern Marianas Islands. The boy and a friend were fishing off the point when he was swept out to sea by the high surf. His young companion tossed a log out to the boy and ran for help. When advised of the accident, Petty Officer LORANGE and three shipmates from U.S. Coast Guard Loran Monitor Station Saipan immediately proceeded to the scene. Upon arrival, the boy was observed approximately 70-yards offshore, holding on to the log in an area locally known as “Shark Alley.” With complete disregard for his own safety, Petty Officer LORANGE dove off the 10 to 12-foot cliff and swam through the 15-foot breaking surf and 10-foot swells to the helpless boy. Reaching the bleeding victim, Petty Officer LORANGE quickly calmed him down and towed him to the base of the cliff. The other Coast Guardsmen then tossed him a life ring with a line attached. While being pulled to safety, Petty Officer LORANGE maintained his hold on the boy while using his feet to fend off the side of the cliff. With the boy safely ashore, Petty Officer LORANGE, a trained EMT, assisted in treating the boy for shock and lacerations while en route to the hospital. Petty Officer LORANGE demonstrated remarkable initiative, exceptional fortitude, and daring in spite of imminent personal danger in this rescue. His unselfish actions, courage and unwavering devotion to duty reflect the highest credit upon himself and the United States Coast Guard.
