= William Flores =

U.S. Coast Guard seaman apprentice

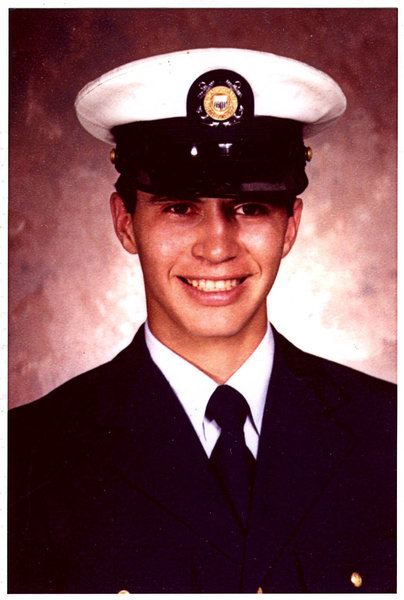
- Seaman Apprentice William R. Flores, USCG
- Born: William Ray Flores; November 6, 1961; Carlsbad, New Mexico, U.S.
- Died: January 28, 1980 (aged 18); Tampa Bay, Florida, U.S.
- Burial place: Benbrook Cemetery; Benbrook, Texas, U.S.
- Military career
- Branch: United States Coast Guard
- Service years: 1979–1980
- Rank: Seaman Apprentice
- Nickname: "Billy" Flores
- Known for: Namesake of USCGC William Flores
- Awards: Coast Guard Medal; Texas Legislative Medal of Honor

William Ray Flores (November 6, 1961 – January 28, 1980) was a seaman apprentice in the United States Coast Guard. SA Flores was posthumously honored for heroic behavior during a 1980 ship collision. In November 2011, the Coast Guard selected Flores as the namesake of the third of its Sentinel class cutters.

== Life ==
Flores was born and raised in Carlsbad, New Mexico. By the time he was in high school, he and his family moved to Benbrook, Texas. With his parents' permission, Flores left Western Hills High School in Benbrook early in order to serve in the United States Coast Guard.

Having been out of boot camp for only one year, Flores was stationed aboard USCGC Blackthorn. As Blackthorn left port from Tampa, Florida on January 28, 1980, the 180-foot seagoing buoy tender collided with the tanker, SS Capricorn, as the tanker entered the bay. The 18-year-old Flores stayed aboard Blackthorn while it sank. He threw life jackets to seamen who were struggling in the water without life jackets. He strapped open the life jacket locker, so that the remaining life jackets were released and floated upwards to the men who were floundering in the water while the vessel sank. Flores then tried to aid wounded seamen who were still aboard. The collision has been described as the worst peacetime disaster in the Coast Guard's history. Seaman Apprentice Flores helped save twenty-three (23) of his crewmates, at the cost of his own life.

== Honors ==
In 2000, twenty years after the collision, Flores was formally honored for his bravery. Flores was posthumously awarded the Coast Guard Medal. The Coast Guard Medal is the highest non-combat bravery award of the United States Coast Guard.

=== Coast Guard Medal Citation ===
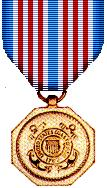

Seaman Apprentice FLORES is cited for heroism on the evening of 28 January 1980 while serving onboard U.S. Coast Guard Cutter BLACKTHORN. Immediately after the collision between SS CAPRICORN and USCGC BLACKTHORN near the entrance to Tampa Bay, Florida, BLACKTHORN rolled to port and capsized before the ship's personnel could prepare for an orderly abandon ship. Exhibiting composure beyond his shipboard experience, Seaman Apprentice FLORES joined another BLACKTHORN crewmember in making their way to the starboard lifejacket locker and commenced throwing lifejackets over the side to fellow crewmembers in the water. Later, as the BLACKTHORN began to submerge and his companion abandoned ship, Seaman Apprentice FLORES remained behind to strap the lifejacket locker door open with his own belt thereby contributing to the survival of struggling shipmates who retrieved lifejackets as they floated to the surface. Even after most of the crewmembers abandoned ship, Seaman Apprentice FLORES, with complete disregard for his own safety, remained on the inverted hull to assist trapped shipmates and provide aid and comfort to injured and disoriented shipmates. His exceptional fortitude, remarkable initiative and courage throughout this tragic incident were instrumental in saving many lives and resulted in the sacrifice of his own life. Seaman Apprentice FLORES' courage, selflessness and devotion to duty are most heartily commended and are in keeping with the highest traditions of the United States Coast Guard.

In November 2011, the Coast Guard named its third Sentinel class cutter USCGC William Flores. All the vessels in this class are to be named after heroic members of the Coast Guard.

"Your Son is Gone," was the last of five Coast Guard marching cadences nominated for Coast Guard Boot Camp's Top Cadence of 2012. The cadence chronicles the last surviving minutes of Seaman Apprentice William R. Flores aboard Coast Guard Cutter Blackthorn January 28, 1980.

St. Petersburg, and the Coast Guard, each held commemorative events to mark the 40th anniversary of Flores' heroic act, in late January 2020. A recently completed life size concrete statue of Flores was unveiled at the ceremony. It will be placed offshore, near the site of the sinking.

In May 2021, Flores was awarded the Texas Legislative Medal of Honor for his actions on Blackthorn.

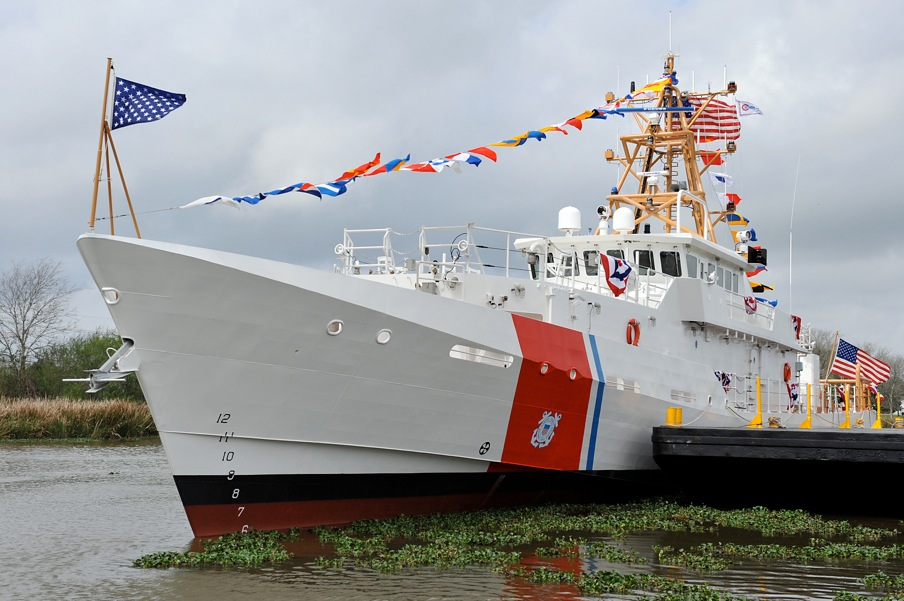
USCGC William Flores on the day of her naming ceremony

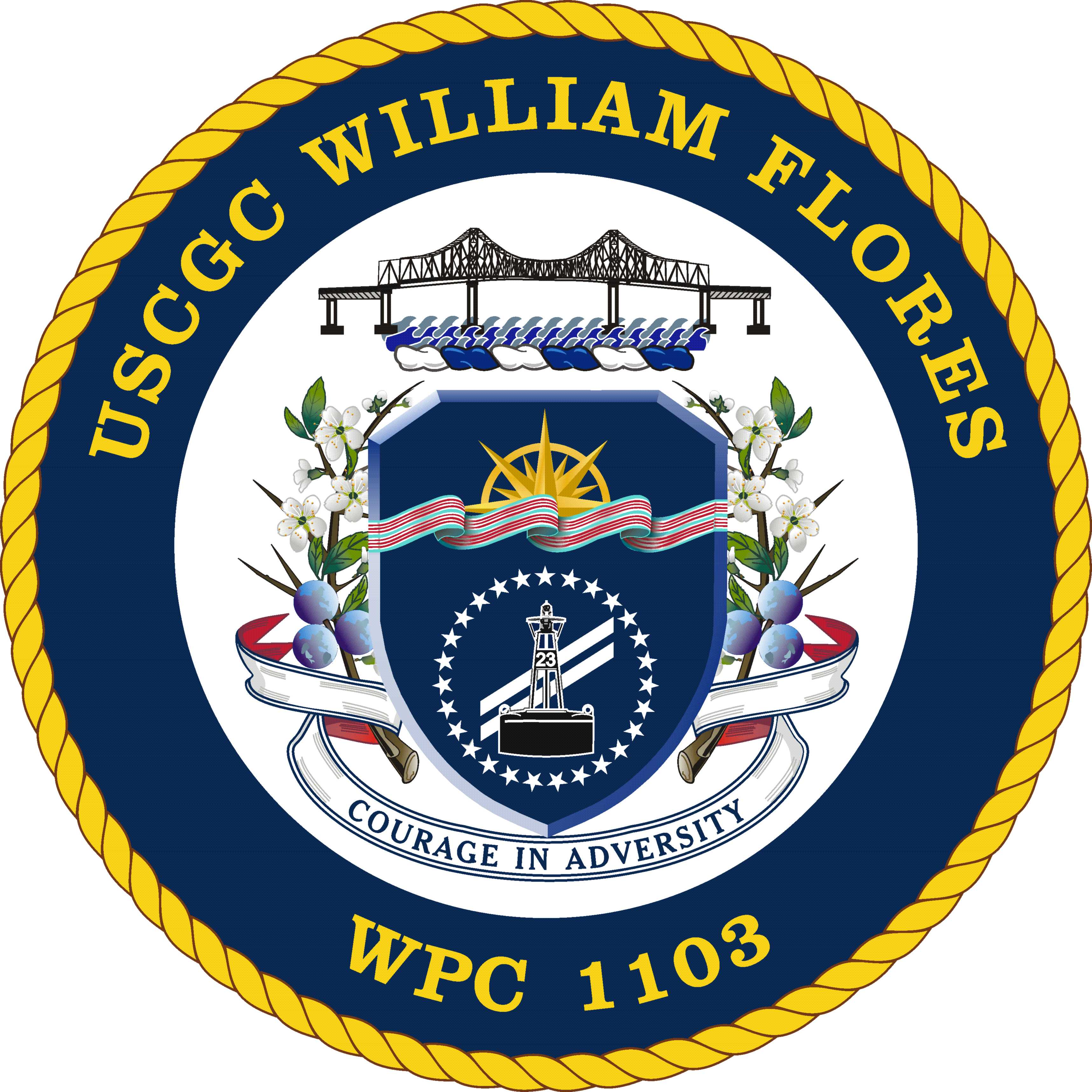
Cutter's coat of arms with symbolism honoring SA Flores

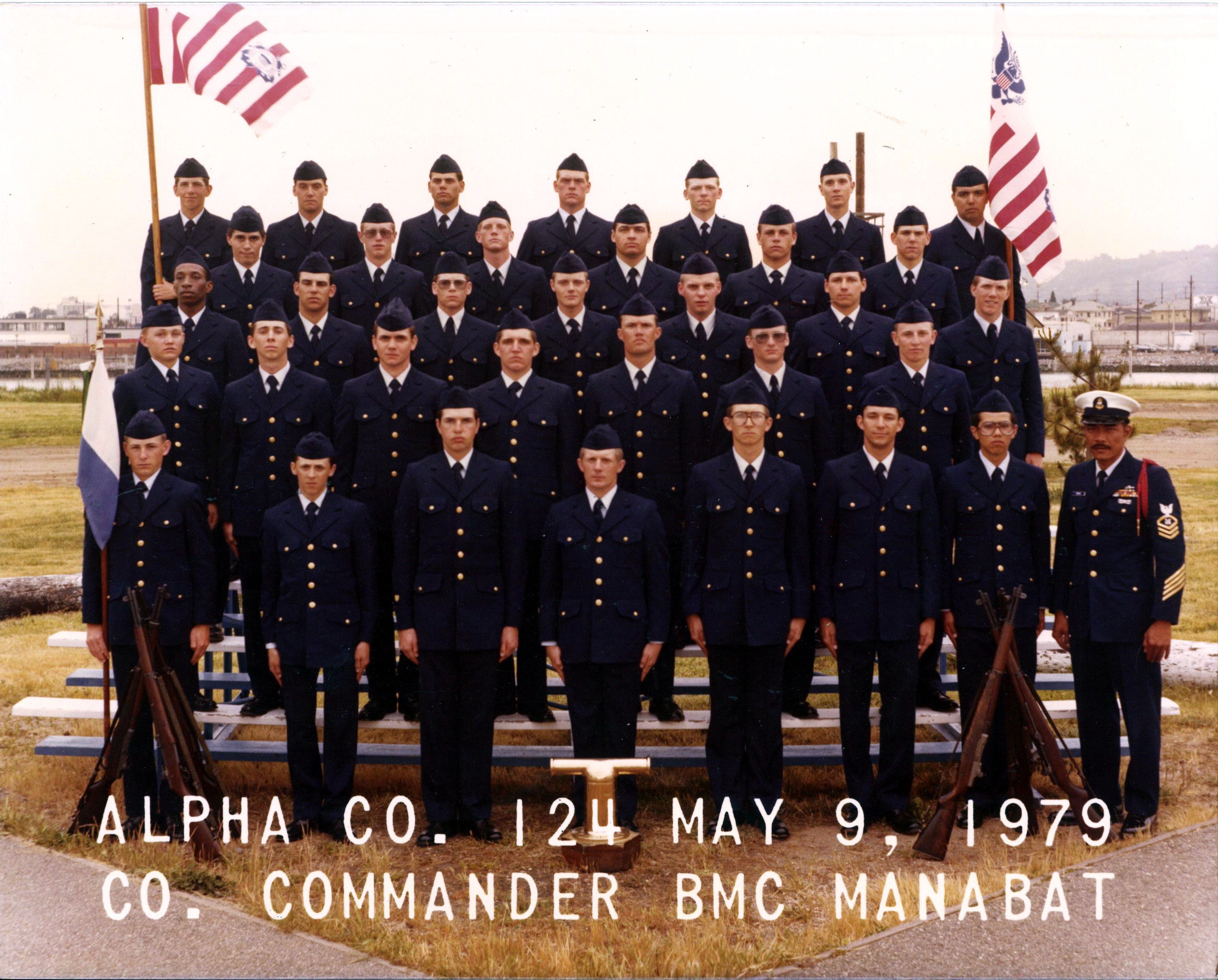
Flores' Company Photo (Far left, 2nd to last row)
