= USCGC Blackthorn =

United States Coast Guard ship, sank 1980

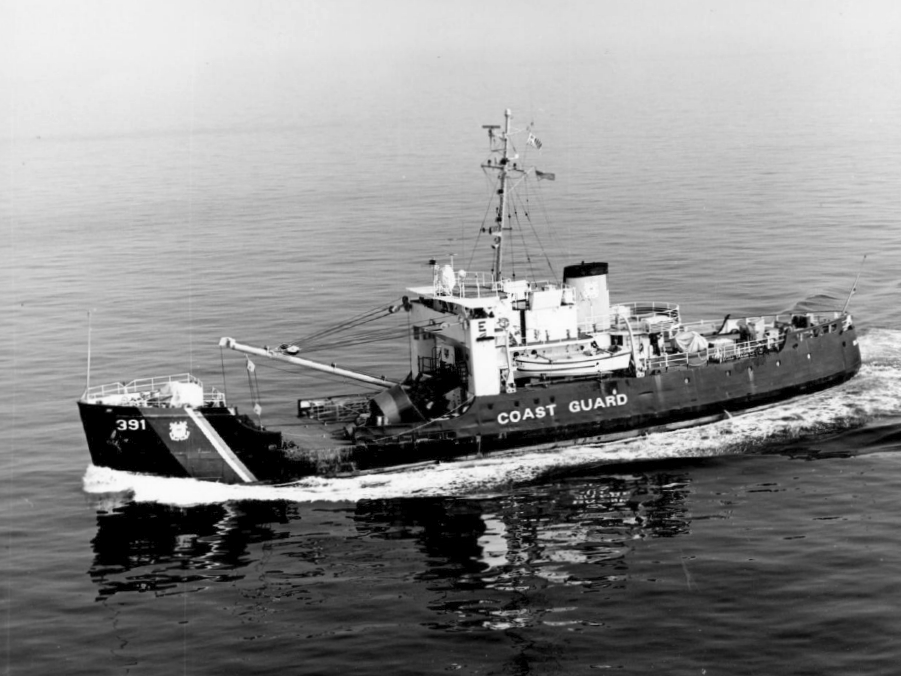
- USCGC Blackthorn (WLB-391) underway in 1972

History

United States
- Name: Blackthorn
- Builder: Marine Ironworks and Shipbuilding Corporation, Duluth, Minnesota
- Cost: $876,403
- Laid down: 21 May 1943
- Launched: 20 July 1943
- Sponsored by: Mrs. Charles A. Park
- Commissioned: 27 March 1944
- Decommissioned: 1980
- Identification: Hull number: WLB-391
- Fate: Sunk in collision 1980

General characteristics
- Class & type: Iris-class buoy tender
- Displacement: 935 long tons (950 t)
- Length: 180 ft (55 m)
- Beam: 37 ft (11 m)
- Installed power: 2 × Cooper-Bessemer diesel engines; 2 × Westinghouse generators
- Propulsion: 1 × electric motor
- Speed: 13 kn (24 km/h; 15 mph) maximum
- Range: 8,000 nmi (15,000 km; 9,200 mi) at 13 kn (24 km/h; 15 mph)
- Complement: 48
- Armament: Wartime: 1 × 3 in (76 mm)/50-caliber single mount; 4 × 20 mm/80-caliber guns; 2 × depth charge tracks; 2 × mousetrap launchers (1944); Peacetime: None

USCGC Blackthorn (WLB-391) was a 180-foot (55 m) seagoing buoy tender (WLB) of the United States Coast Guard that sank following a collision in Tampa Bay, resulting in 23 fatalities.

On 28 January 1980, while leaving Tampa Bay after an overhaul, Blackthorn collided with the tanker SS Capricorn near the Sunshine Skyway Bridge. (Note: At the time of this incident, the Sunshine Skyway Bridge was two-lane beam bridge that had been completed in 1954. Several months later, in May 1980, that bridge partially collapsed when struck by the bulk carrier MV Summit Venture. The 1954 bridge was subsequently replaced by a cable-stayed bridge, which opened in 1987.) Shortly after the collision, Blackthorn capsized, killing 23 of her crew. She was raised for an investigation, then was scuttled in the Gulf of Mexico after the investigation was complete. She currently serves as an artificial reef for recreational diving and fishing.

== Operational history ==
An Iris-class vessel, she was built by Marine Ironworks and Shipbuilding Corporation in Duluth, Minnesota. Blackthorn's preliminary design was completed by the United States Lighthouse Service and the final design was produced by Marine Iron and Shipbuilding Corporation in Duluth. On 21 May 1943, the keel was laid. She was launched on 20 July 1943, sponsored by the wife of Rear Admiral Charles A. Park. Blackthorn was commissioned on 27 March 1944. The original cost for the hull and machinery was $876,403 ($16 million in 2025).

Blackthorn was one of 39 original 180-foot (55 m) seagoing buoy tenders built between 1942 and 1944. All but one of the original tenders, USCGC Ironwood, were built in Duluth.

Blackthorn was initially assigned to the Great Lakes for ice-breaking duties, but after only a few months, she was reassigned to San Pedro, California. She served in San Pedro for several years before being brought into the gulf coast region to serve in Mobile, Alabama, then transferred to Galveston, Texas, for the final years of her service until her sinking.

In 1979–1980, Blackthorn underwent a major overhaul in Tampa, Florida.

=== Collision and sinking ===
Having just completed her overhaul at the Gulf Tampa Drydock Company, which included overhaul of the main propulsion generators, Blackthorn was outward bound from Tampa Bay on the night of 28 January 1980. Meanwhile, the tanker Capricorn, owned by Kingston Shipping Company and operated by Apex Marine Corporation of New York, was standing (traveling with right-of-way) into the bay. Blackthorn's captain, Lieutenant Commander George Sepel, had departed the ship's bridge to investigate a problem with the newly installed propulsion shaft. Ensign John Ryan had the conn.

Earlier, the cutter had been overtaken by the Russian passenger ship Kazakhstan. When requested by Kazakhstan to pass, the Blackthorn navigated starboard permitting Kazakhstan to complete the maneuver. The Blackthorn then navigated to almost mid-channel and resumed course. (Note: Some contend that the brightly lit passenger vessel obscured the ability of the crews of Blackthorn and Capricorn to see each other.)

Capricorn began to turn left, but this course would not allow Capricorn and Blackthorn to pass port-to-port, as the rules of navigation generally required. Unable to make radio contact with Blackthorn, Capricorn's pilot blew two short whistle blasts to have the ships pass starboard-to-starboard. With the Blackthorn's officer of the deck, Ensign Ryan, confused in regard to the standard operating procedure and rules of navigation, Blackthorn's captain issued orders for evasive action. Despite the Blackthorn's evasive action, a collision occurred.

Damage to the Blackthorn from the initial impact was not extensive. However, Capricorn's anchor was ready to be let go. The anchor became embedded in the Blackthorn's hull and ripped open the port (left) side above the water line. Then, as the two ships backed away from each other, the chain became taut. The force of the much larger ship, Capricorn, pulling on the chain caused the smaller ship, Blackthorn, to tip on her side until she suddenly capsized. Six off-duty personnel who had mustered when they heard the collision alarm were trapped inside the ship. Several crew members who had just reported aboard tried to escape and in the process trapped themselves in the engine room. Although 27 crewmen survived the collision, 23 perished.

== Investigation ==
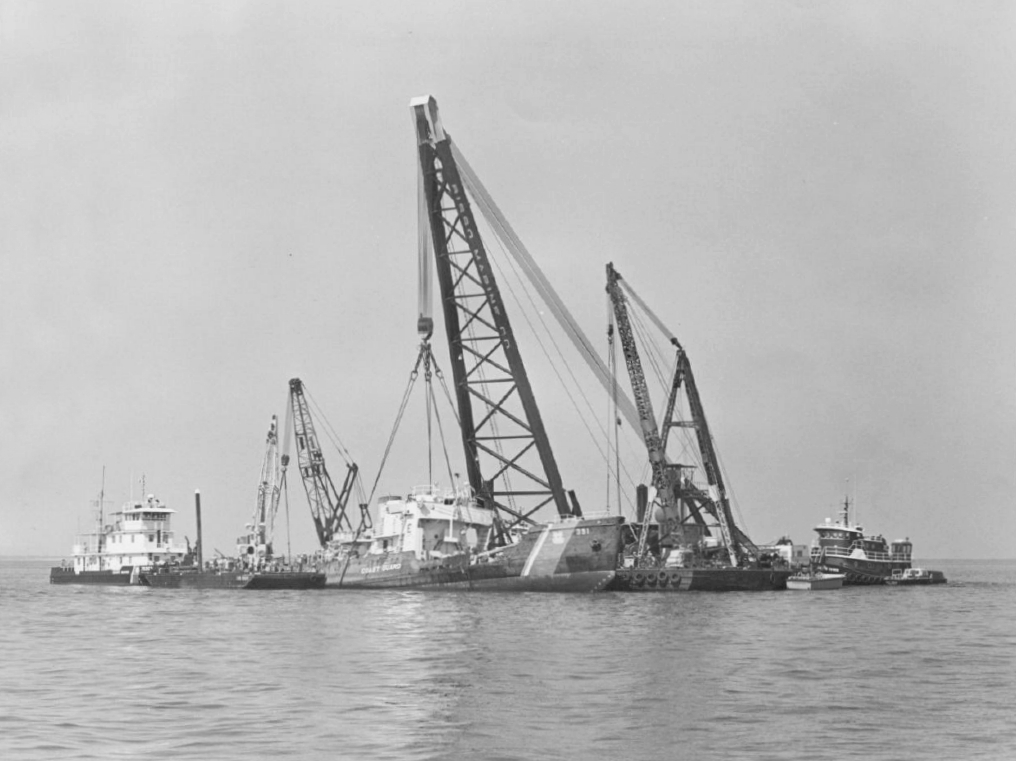
Blackthorn being raised in 1980

Primary responsibility for the collision was placed on the Blackthorn's captain, Lt. Commander Sepel, as he had made an inexperienced junior officer, Ensign Ryan, officer of the deck and allowed him to navigate the ship through an unfamiliar waterway with heavy traffic.

The Commandant of the United States Coast Guard, Admiral John B. Hayes, approved the report of the marine board of investigation on the collision between Blackthorn and Capricorn. The board determined that the cause of the collision was the failure of both vessels to keep well to the side of the channel which lay on each ship's starboard (right) sides. Concurring with the marine board's determination of the cause, the Commandant emphasized in his "Action" that the failure of the persons in charge of both vessels to ascertain the intentions of the other through the exchange of appropriate whistle signals was the primary contributing cause. Additionally, Admiral Hayes pointed out that attempts to establish a passing agreement by using only radiotelephone communications failed to be an adequate substitute for exchanging proper whistle signals.

The marine board found evidence of violation of various navigation laws on the parts of Capricorn's master and pilot. There were similar findings on the part of Blackthorn's commanding officer and officer of the deck. These matters were referred to the commanders of the Seventh and Eighth Coast Guard Districts for further investigation and appropriate action.

The Commandant also acted on various safety recommendations made by the marine board concerning training and equipment aboard Coast Guard vessels, and navigation considerations in Tampa Bay.

=== Seaman apprentice William Flores ===
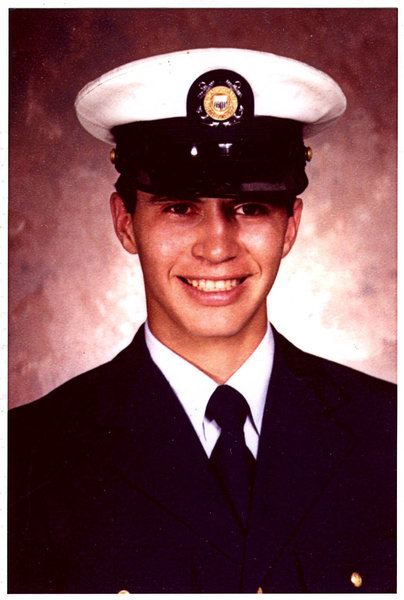
William Flores

William Flores was originally from Carlsbad, New Mexico, and attended Western Hills High School near Fort Worth, Texas. During the sinking of Blackthorn, seaman apprentice Flores, who had been out of boot camp just one year, opened the life jacket locker as Blackthorn capsized, securing its hatch open with his belt, and made sure that his shipmates were able to access and use the life jackets. His actions saved a number of lives during the accident at the cost of his own.

Flores' heroism was initially overlooked by the two official reports by the Coast Guard and the National Transportation Safety Board (NTSB), but was later recognized. In 2000, he was posthumously awarded the Coast Guard Medal, the service's highest award for heroism in peacetime. In October 2010, it was announced that the third new Sentinel-class fast response cutter, a 154-foot (47 m) patrol boat, would be named USCGC William Flores. In May 2021, he was posthumously awarded the Texas Legislative Medal of Honor for his actions on Blackthorn.

== Gallery ==
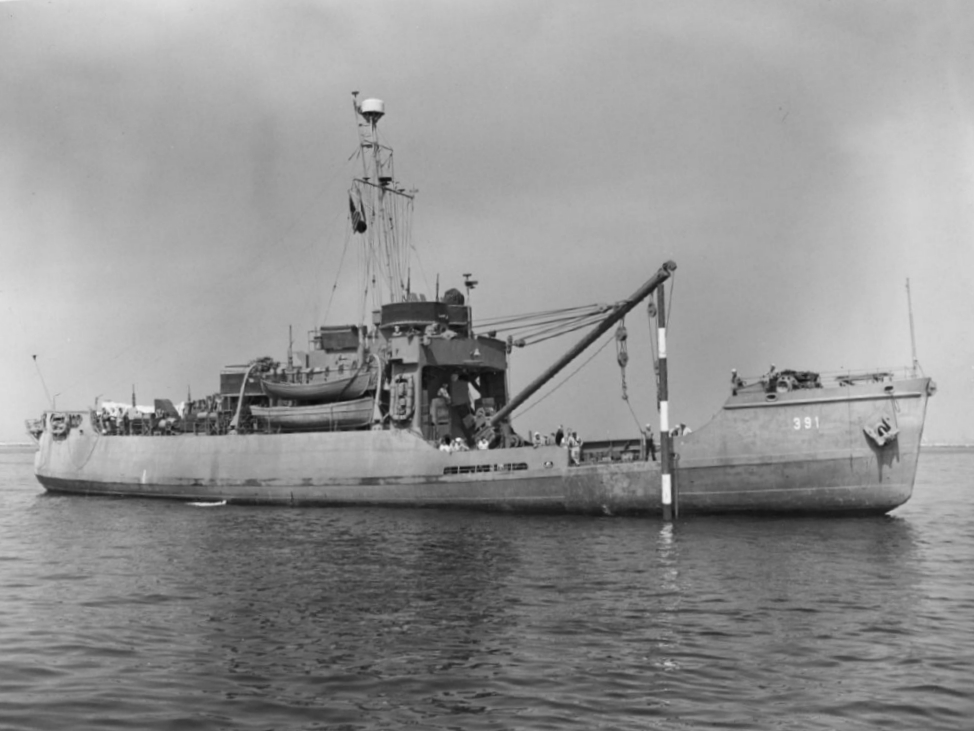
Blackthorn circa 1945

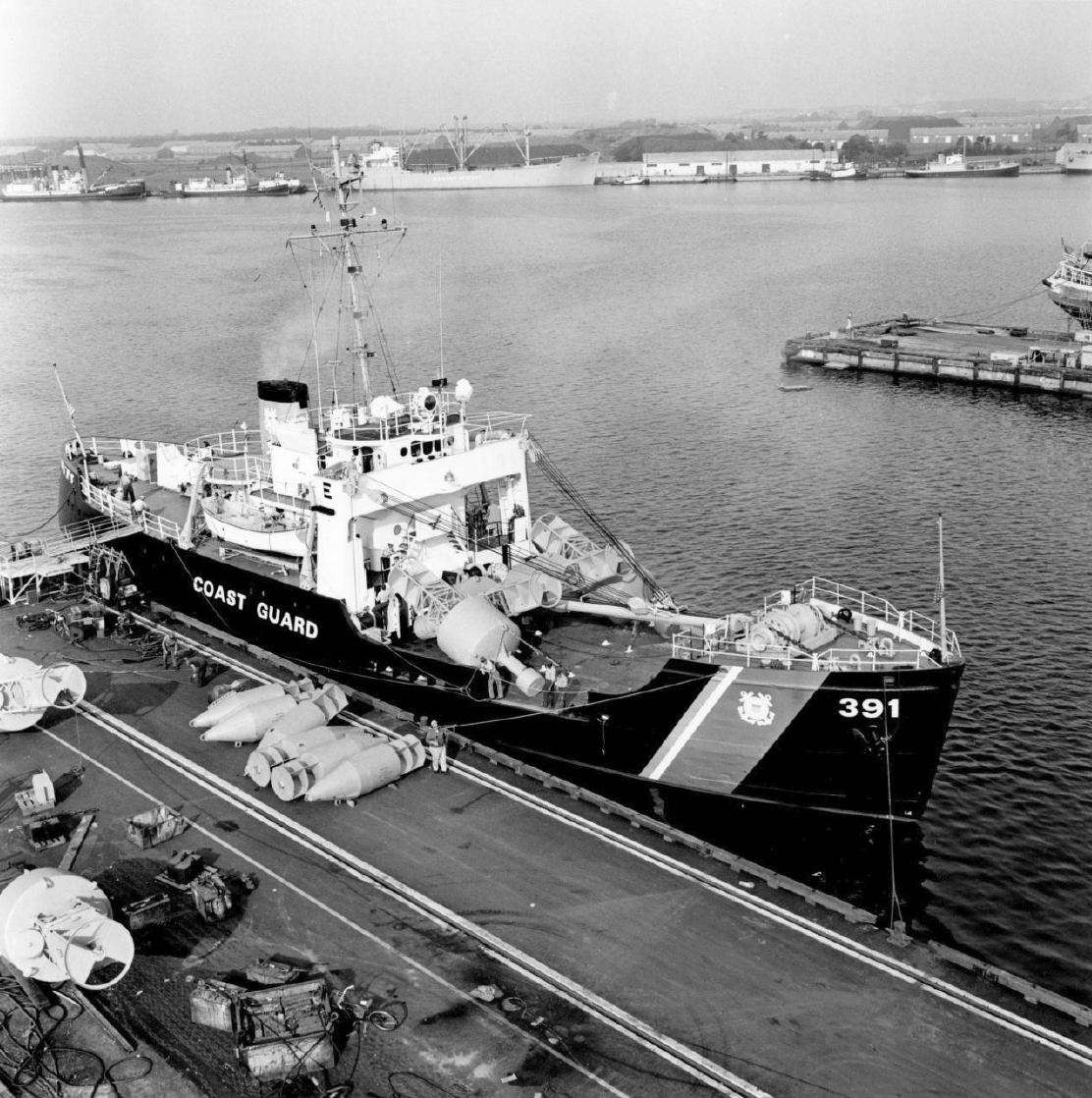
Blackthorn circa 1970s

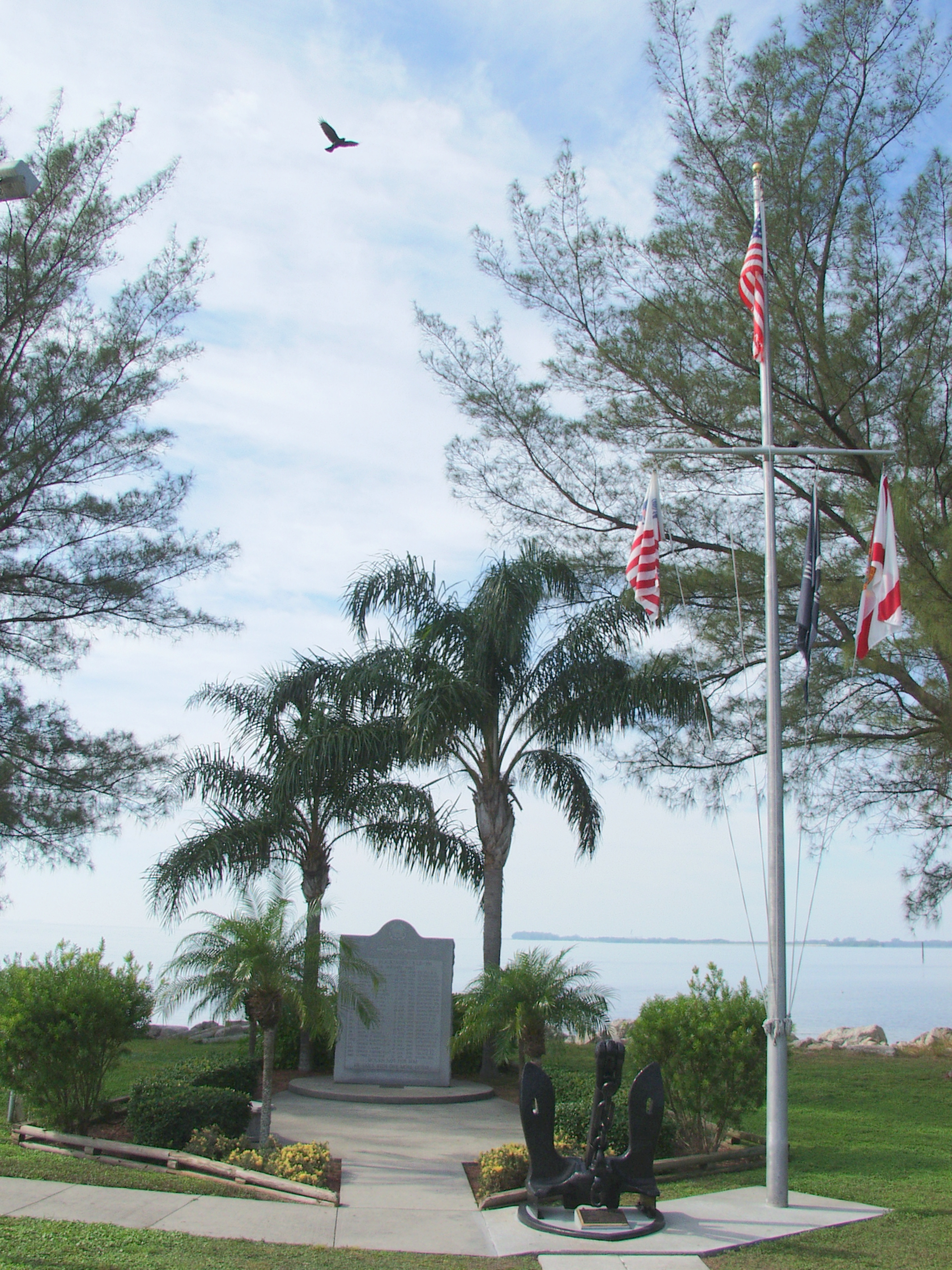
Blackthorn memorial

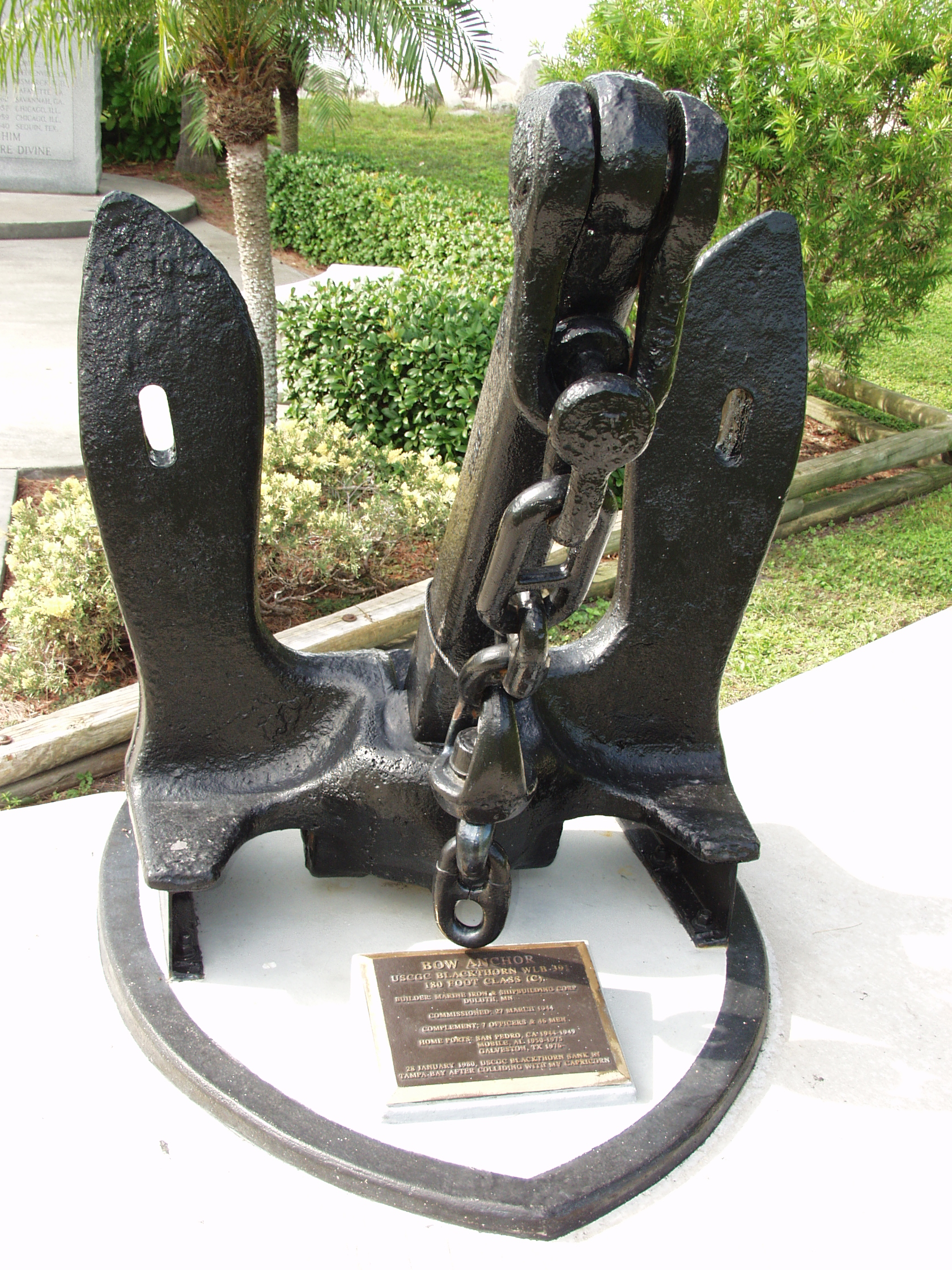
Ship's anchor

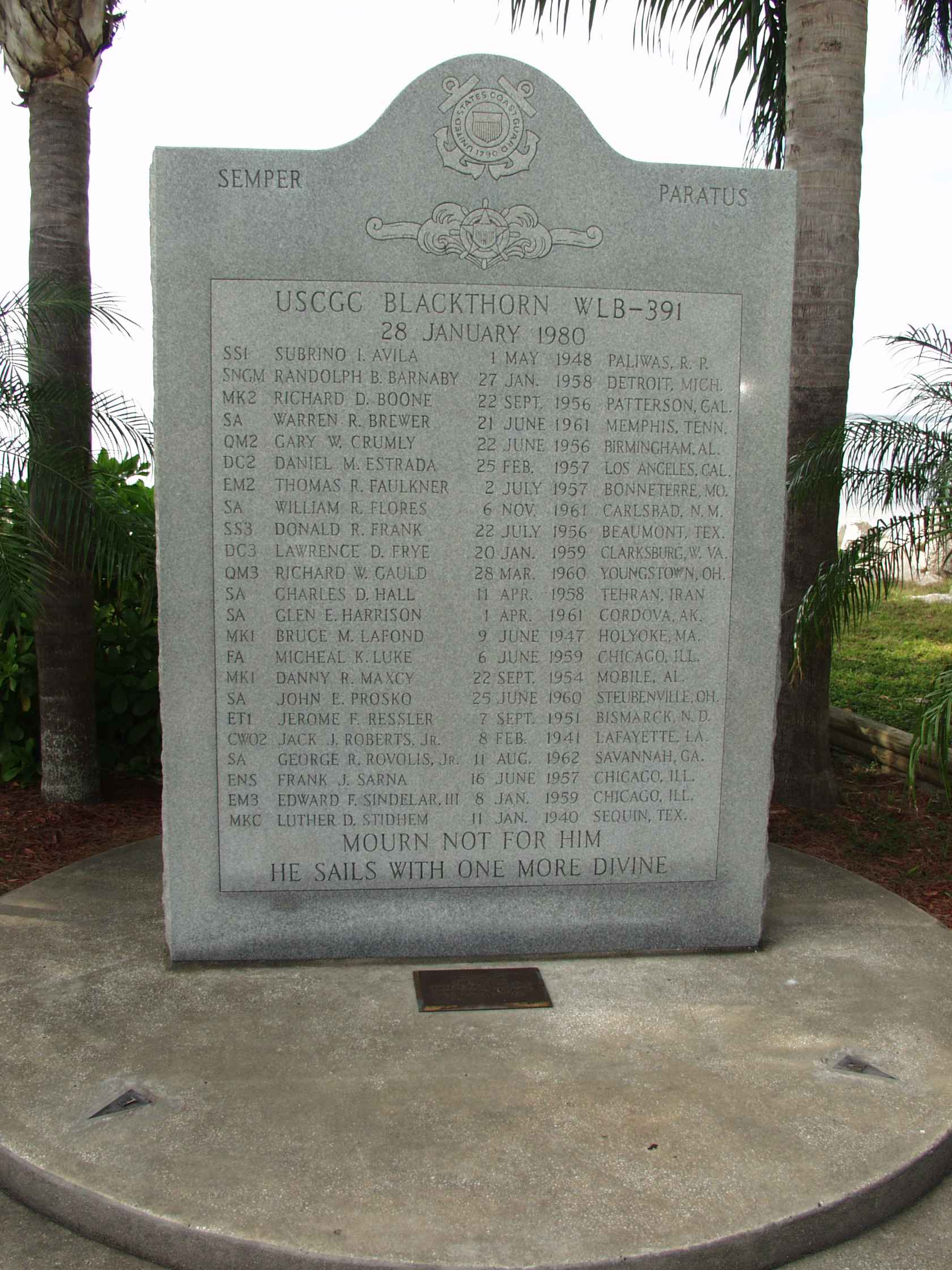
Memorial wall
