= Richard R. Callahan =

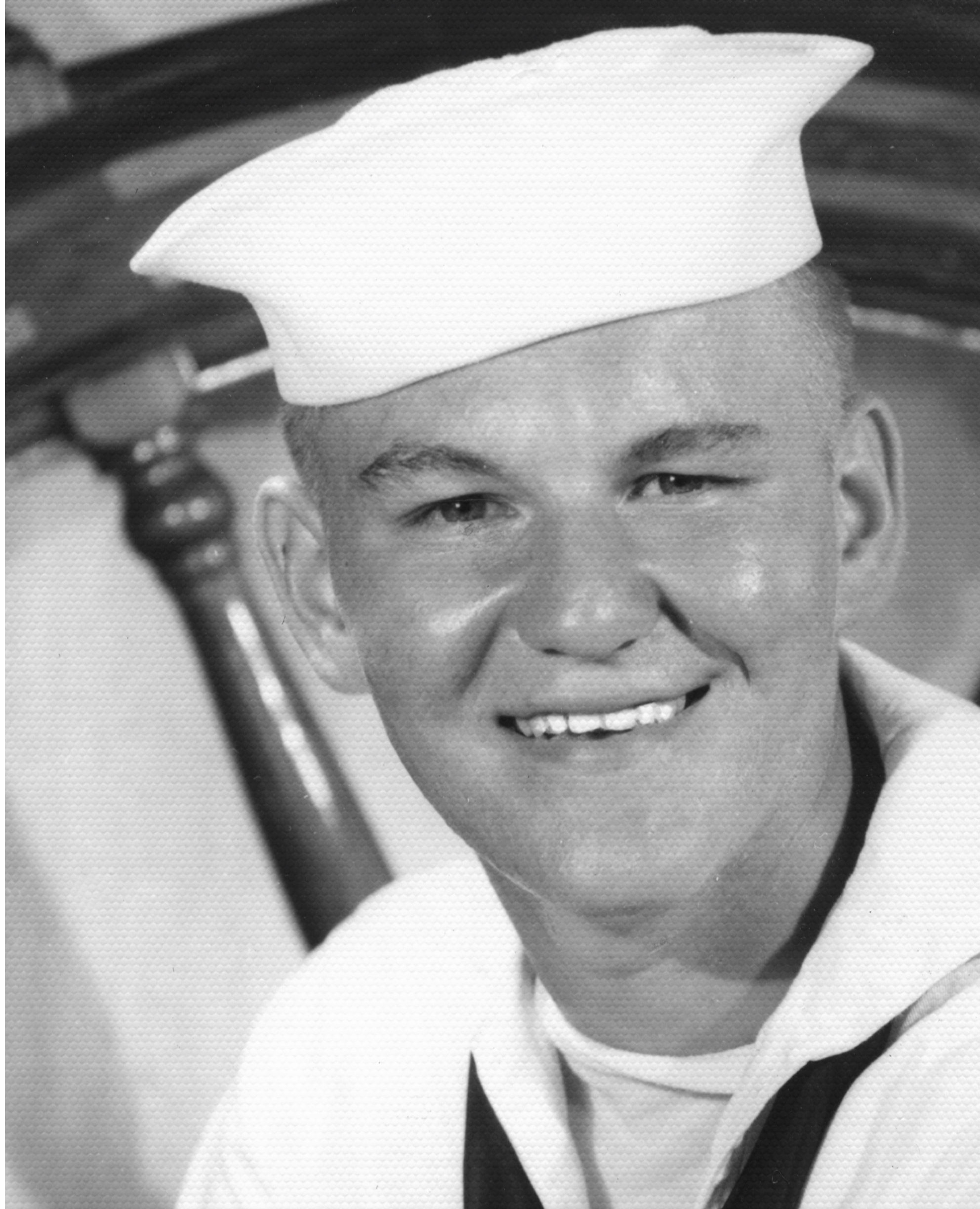
- Richard Callahan, Coast Guard Medal recipient
- Born: July 19, 1947; Cicero, Illinois, U.S.
- Died: June 6, 1967 (aged 19); Chicago, Illinois, U.S.
- Burial place: Hillside, Illinois
- Military career
- Allegiance: United States of America
- Branch: United States Coast Guard
- Service years: 1964–1967
- Rank: Petty Officer Second Class
- Nicknames: Rich, Casey
- Units: Lifeboat Station Duluth, USCGC Woodrush (WLB-407), Coast Guard Marine Inspection Office Duluth
- Awards: Coast Guard Medal, National Defense Service Medal, Coast Guard Good Conduct Medal

Coast Guardsman – Boatswain Mate Second Class (BM2) Richard R. Callahan of Cicero, Illinois (July 19, 1947 – June 6, 1967) was awarded the Coast Guard Medal for heroic life saving actions along with two comrades.

Boatswain Mate First Class (BM1) Edgar Culbertson, 32, of Ferndale, Michigan lost his life on April 30, 1967, while trying to rescue three teenagers in Duluth, Minnesota. Three teenage boys had been seen on the north pier break wall of the Duluth entry during a horrific storm. Meteorologist and Minnesota residents often refer to this day as Black Sunday describing the fierce 1967 Southern Minnesota tornado outbreak, with reports of heavy rain as far north as Duluth that day.

BM1 Edgar Culbertson, along with two other coast guardsmen; Boatswain Mate 2nd Class Richard R. Callahan, 21, of Cicero, Illinois; and Fireman Ronald C. Prei, 21, of St. Francis, Wisconsin braved the storm and ventured out along the pier in search of the missing teenagers. A witness had reported seeing the teenagers caught in the storm on the pier while one of the boys was swept over the side by a huge wave. Local resident and friend of "Ed", Captain Tom Mackay, recalled the evening of this infamous storm as being so windy and rough it blew the chimney down on the Mackay house which was a few miles from the north pier break wall of the Duluth entry and farther down Park Point.

The three coast guardsmen connected themselves to each other by tying between them. They struggled through the storm to the end of the pier but did not find the missing boys, who had already been swept over the side themselves before the coast guardsmen could save them. As the team of rescuers shuffled back along the pier to safety another large wave crashed into the team, knocking BM1 Edgar Culbertson over the side and away from the others. He was soon found on the beach by his shipmates but it was too late, he had been killed trying to save lives.

A permanent marker, honoring the brave acts of Edgar Culbertson, was placed on the pier near the Lake Superior Maritime Visitor Center near the spot where Culbertson perished. Culbertson is one of only two Coasties to have died in the line of duty while serving in Minnesota, the other was EN3 Keith Brubaker who fell overboard and perished on July 11, 1967, while serving the Station North Superior in Grand Marais, Minnesota.

The original bronze plaque was erected some time after Culbertson gave his life to the vicious storm. However, in the early 1980s the plaque was removed as the pier was widened and reinforced. Captain Tom Mackay, then a Captain for the Vista Fleet and president of the International Shipmasters Association (ISMA) Twin Ports Lodge #12 realized the plaque had not been reinstalled. Fearing that his friend, and fellow sailor would be forgotten forever, Mackay rallied those at the ISMA to help him locate the plaque and have it reinstalled. A short time later, fellow members of the ISMA found the plaque in storage and had it reinstalled on the new pier so BM1 Edgar Culbertson could continue to be memorialized as the only known member of the United States Coast Guard to lose his life in Duluth in service to his country and community of Duluth, Minnesota.

BM1 Edgar Culbertson was posthumously awarded the Coast Guard Medal as well as BM2 Richard R. Callahan, FN Ronald C. Prei were awarded the Coast Guard Medal.

== Coast Guard Medal Citation ==
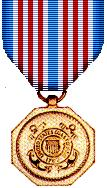

Date of Action: 30 April 1967 Date of Award: 17 August 1967

For heroism on the evening of April 30, 1967 while engaged in searching for two teen-age boys reportedly stranded at the Duluth Entry North Breakwater Light, Minnesota. Twin 16-year-old boys and a brother had been seen running along the jetty challenging the 10 to 15-foot waves when witnesses observed a huge wave sweep one boy into the water. When two boys were reported stranded at the light, Petty Officer CALLAHAN and two comrades volunteered to attempt the rescue. Lashing themselves together, the three men proceeded, with hand lanterns as the only illumination, to the end of the breakwater. Despite the high waves, winds gusting to 40 knots, driving rain, and 36 degree water, the rescue party diligently searched the breakwater and light but found no trace of the boys. While returning to the beach a 20-foot wave swept the lead man off the jetty nearly causing the loss of all three men. Petty Officer CALLAHAN in attempting to retrieve his fellow Coastguardsman suffered a broken wrist and severe body bruises. In spite of excruciating pain, through sheer determination, Petty Officer CALLAHAN and his companion managed to pull their teammate onto the beach, where all efforts to revive him failed. Petty Officer CALLAHAN's courage, unselfish actions, perseverance and unwavering devotion to duty reflect the highest credit upon himself and the United States Coast Guard.

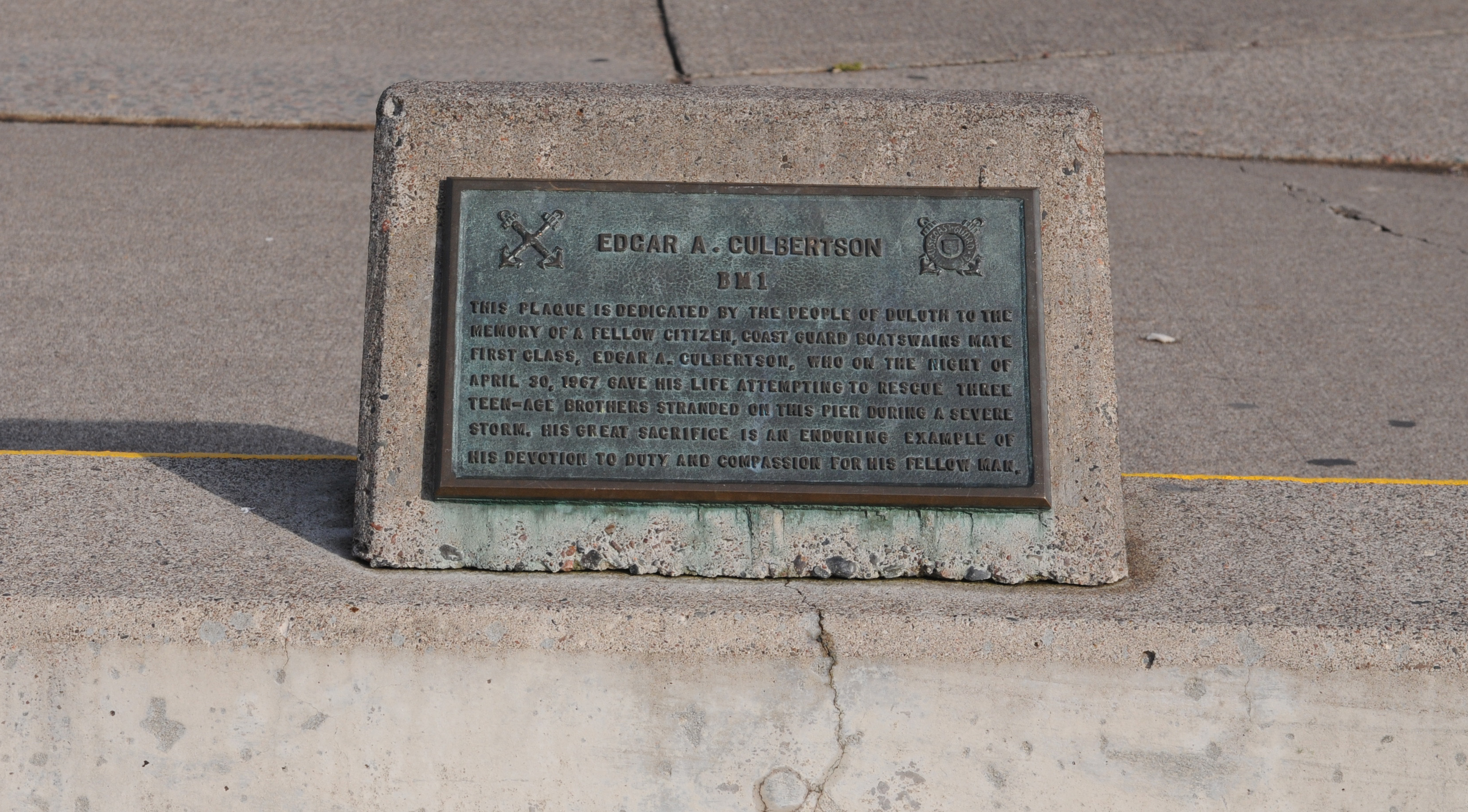
Edgar Culbertson plaque

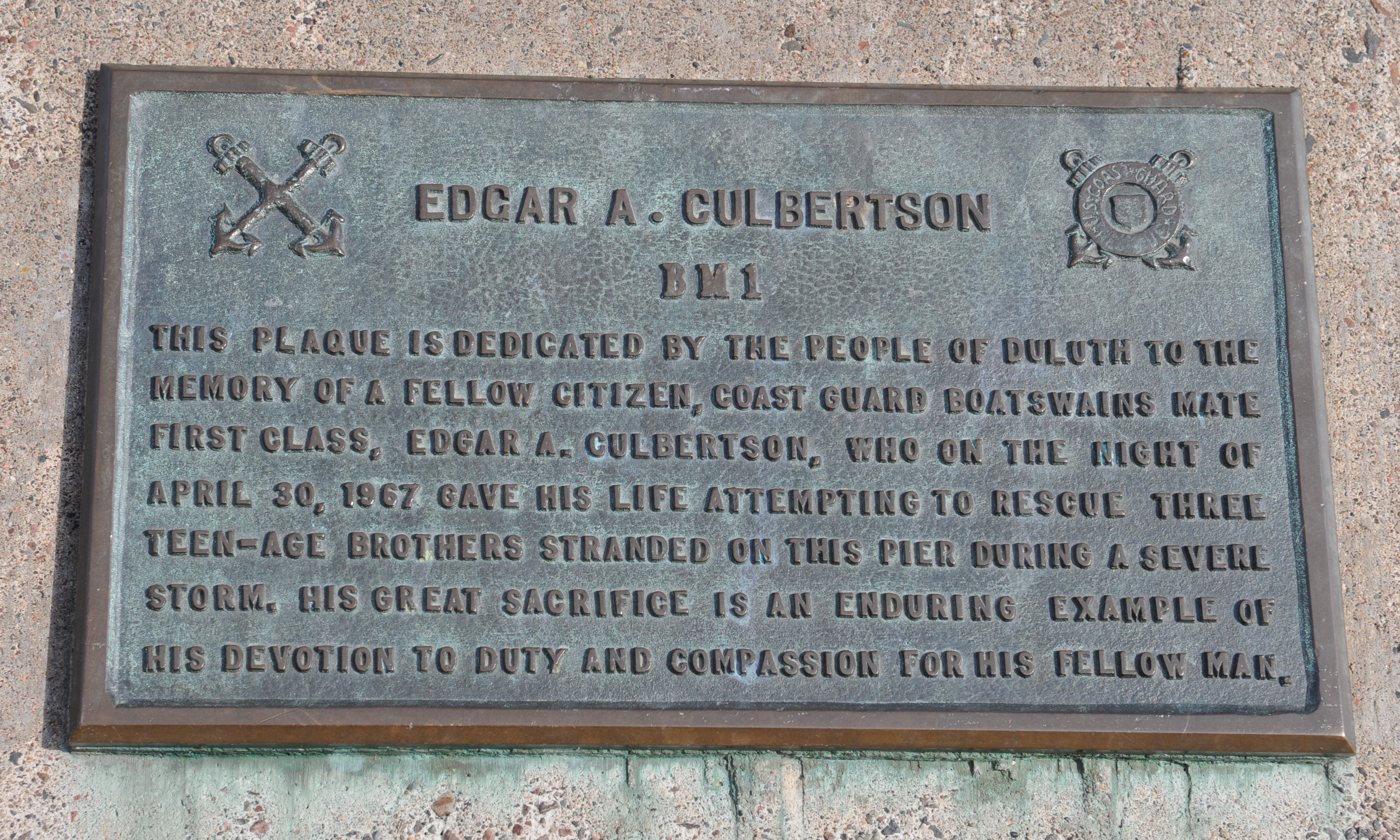
Edgar Culbertson plaque

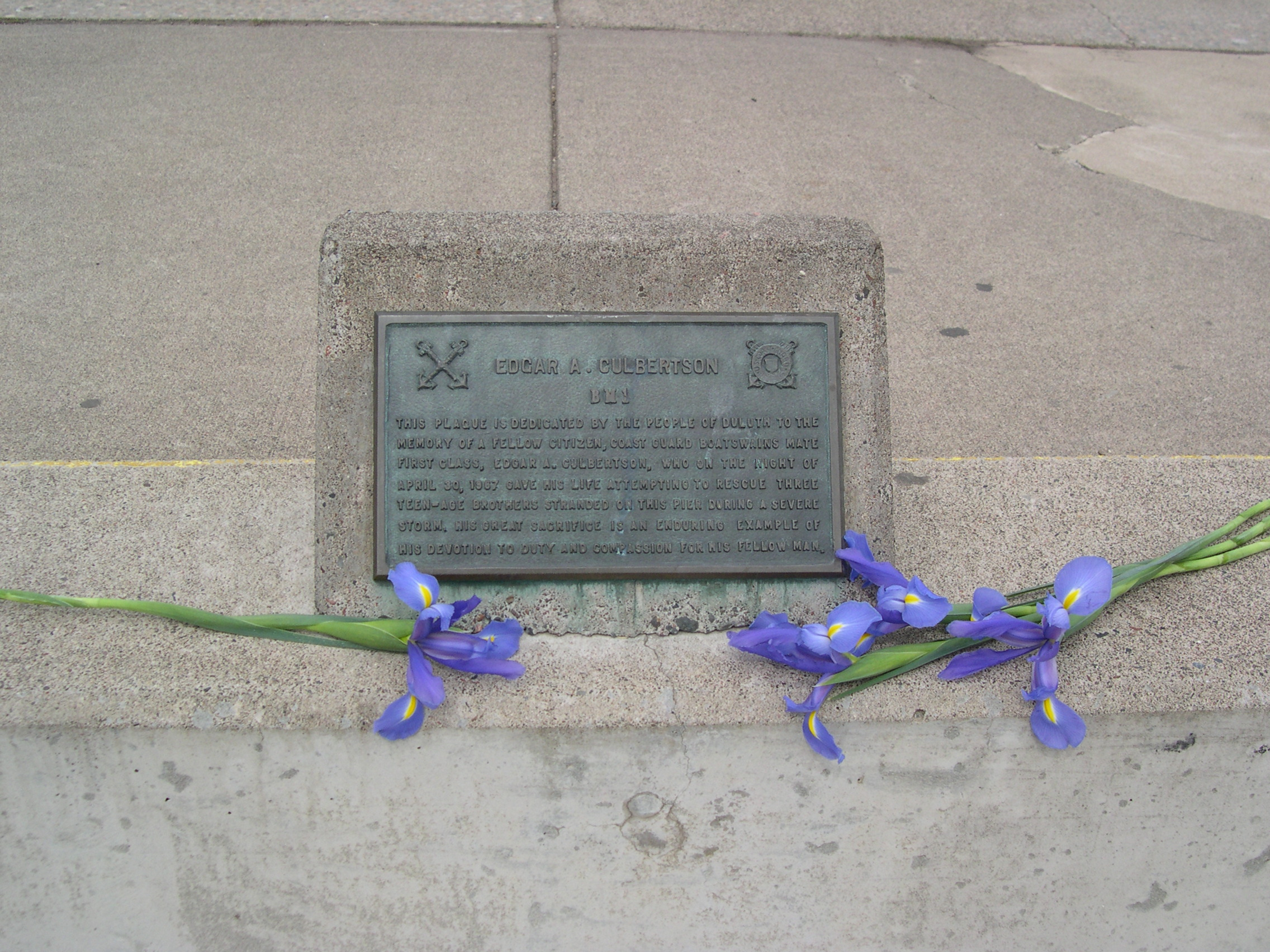
2007 Memorial Service

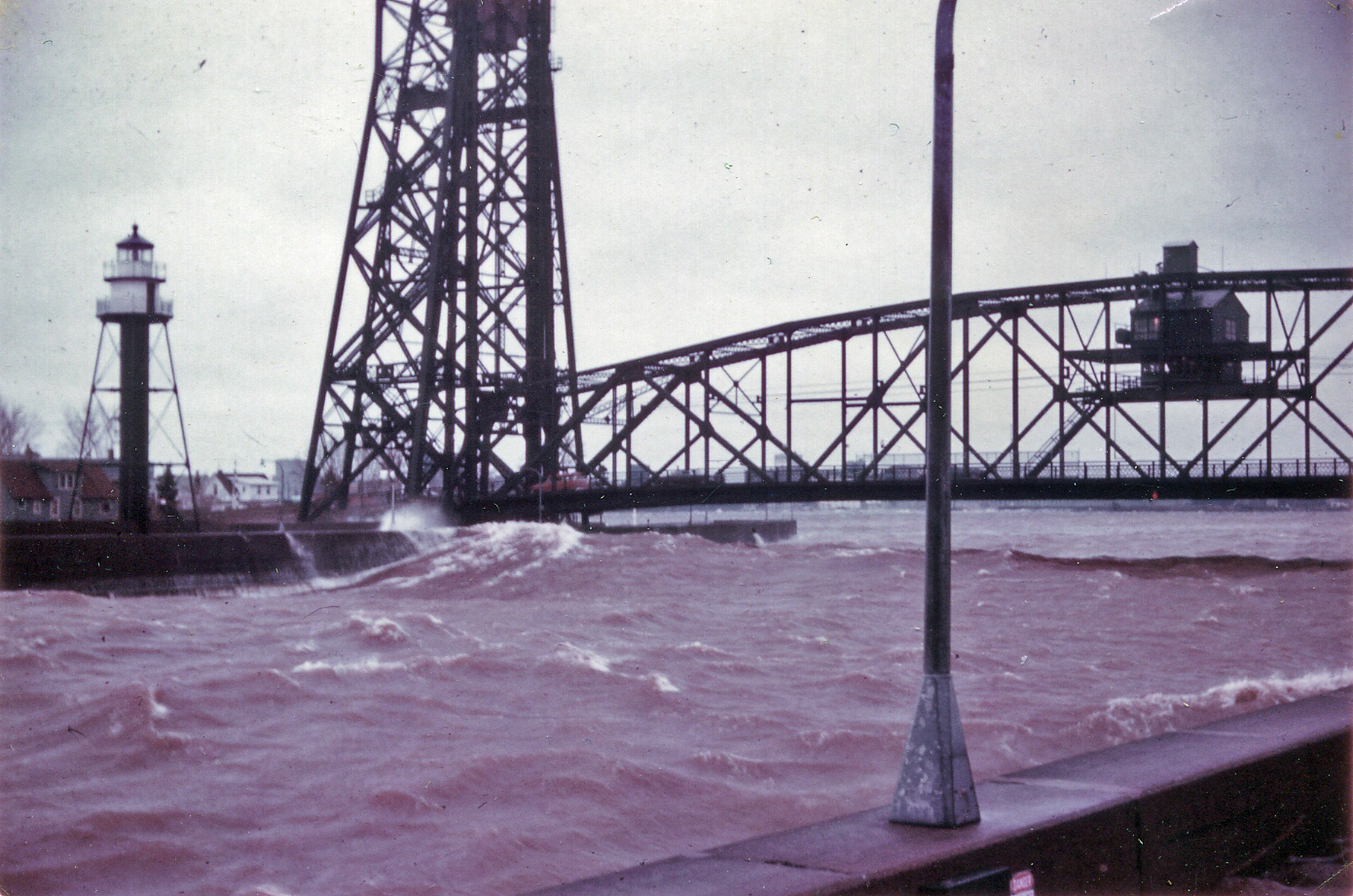
Great Duluth Storm of April 30, 1967 - Duluth Entry

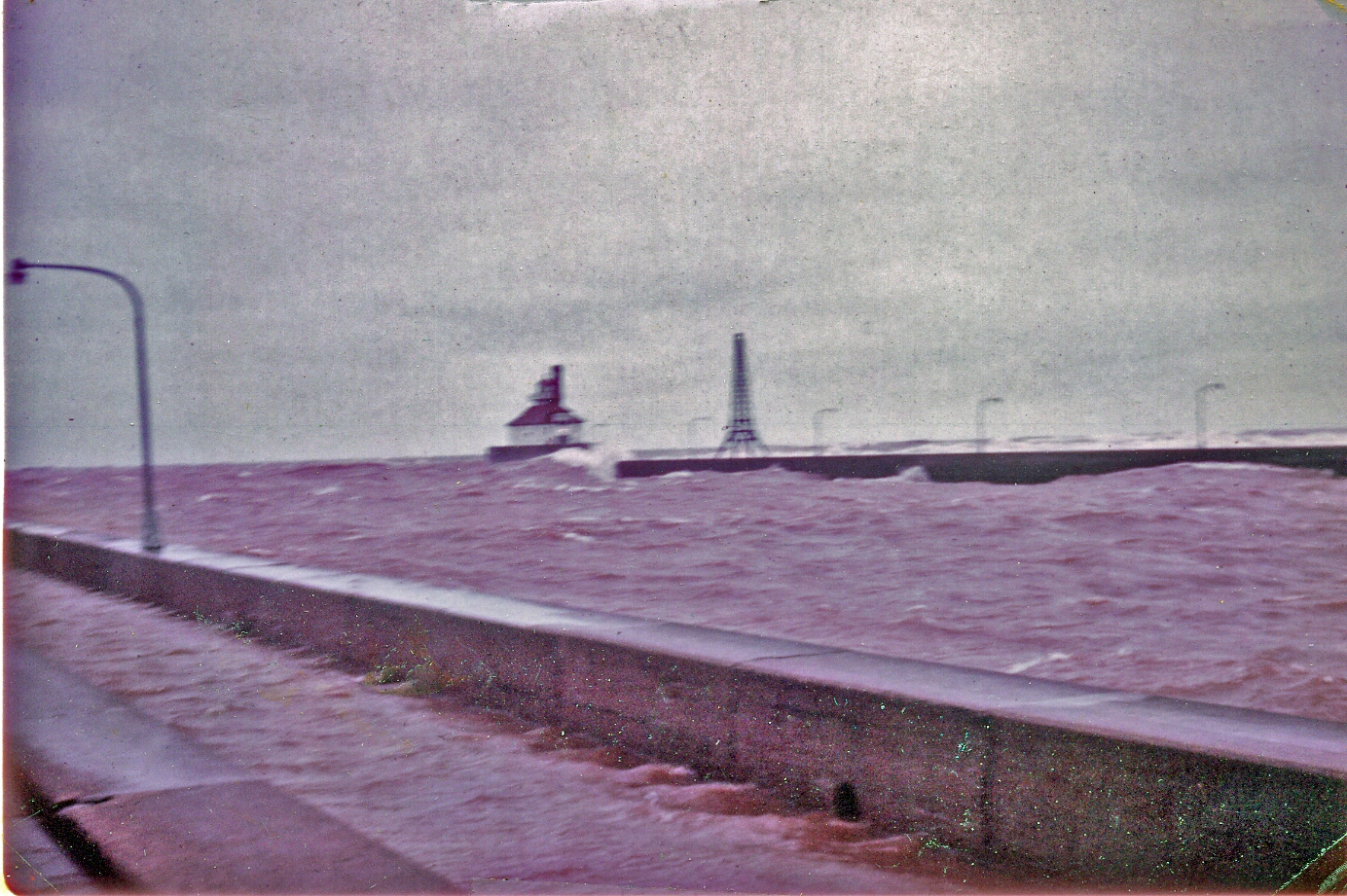
Great Duluth Storm of April 30, 1967 - Duluth Entry

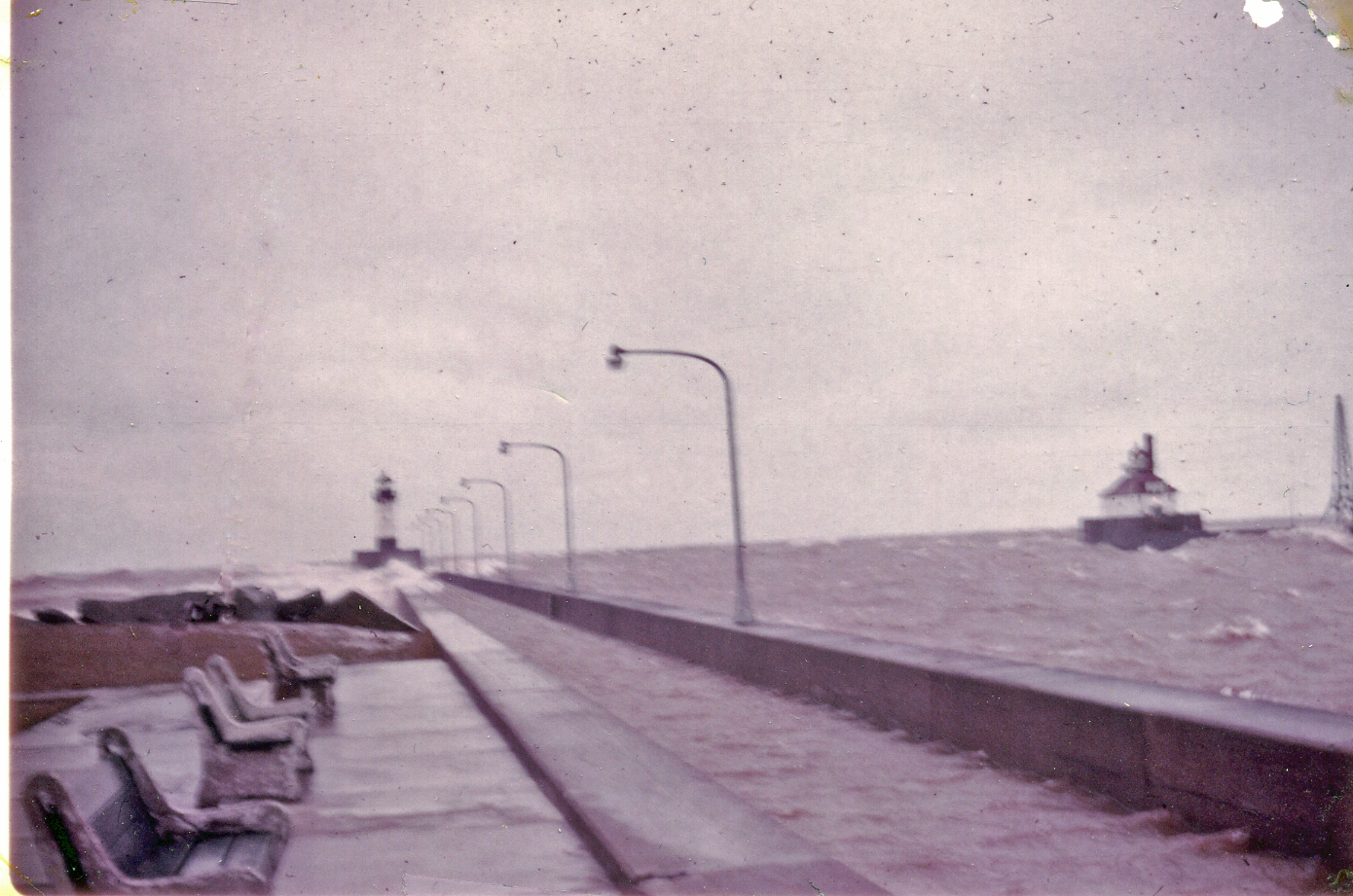
Great Duluth Storm of April 30, 1967 - Duluth Entry
