= USCGC William Flores =

2011 Sentinel-class cutter

USCGC William Flores (WPC-1103)
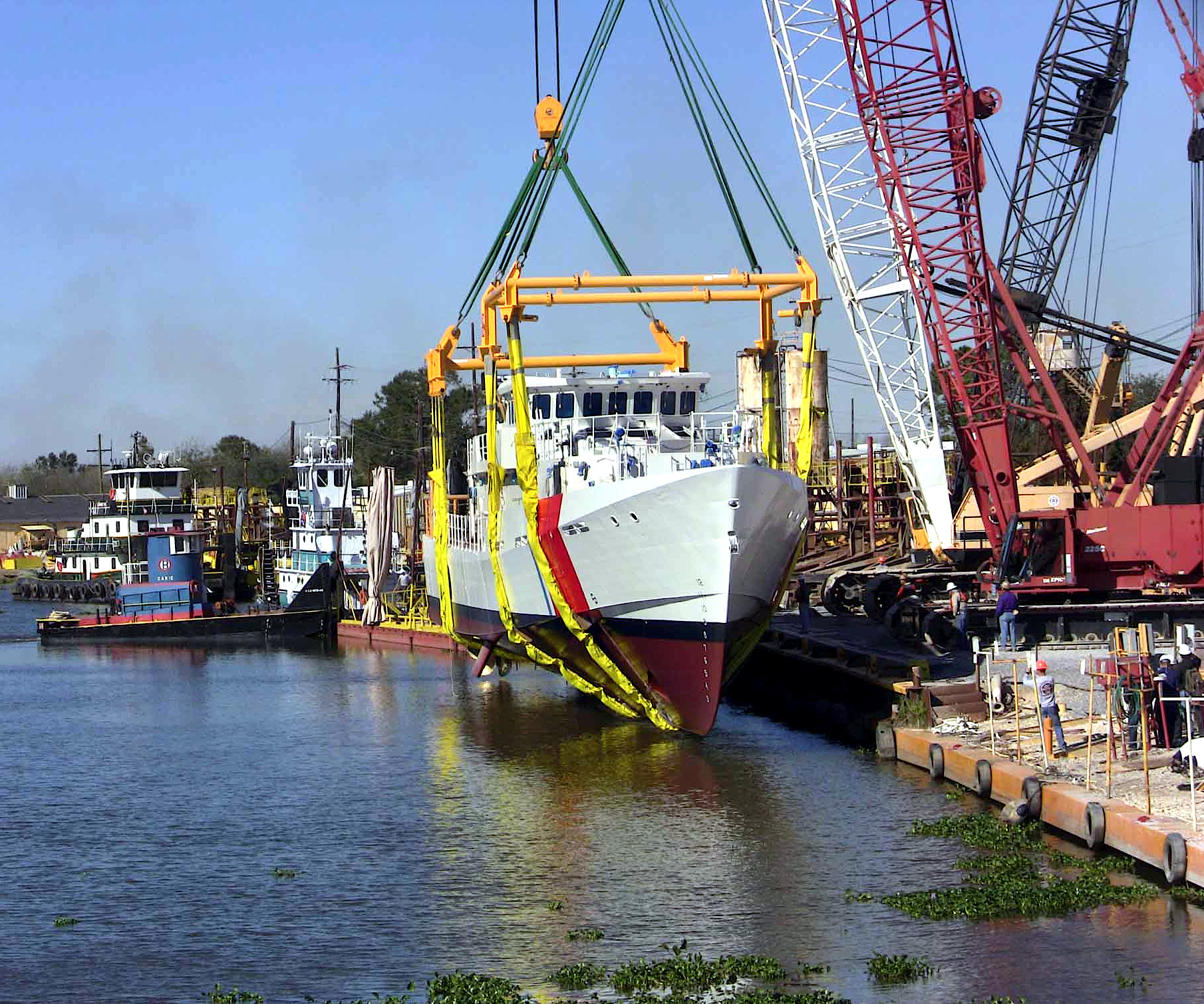
- Launch of William Flores

History

United States
- Name: USCGC William Flores
- Namesake: William Flores
- Builder: Bollinger Shipyards, Lockport, Louisiana
- Launched: 29 November 2011
- Acquired: 15 August 2012
- Commissioned: 3 November 2012
- Identification: MMSI number: 338926403; Callsign: NILB; Hull number: WPC-1103
- Motto: Courage in adversity
- Status: in active service
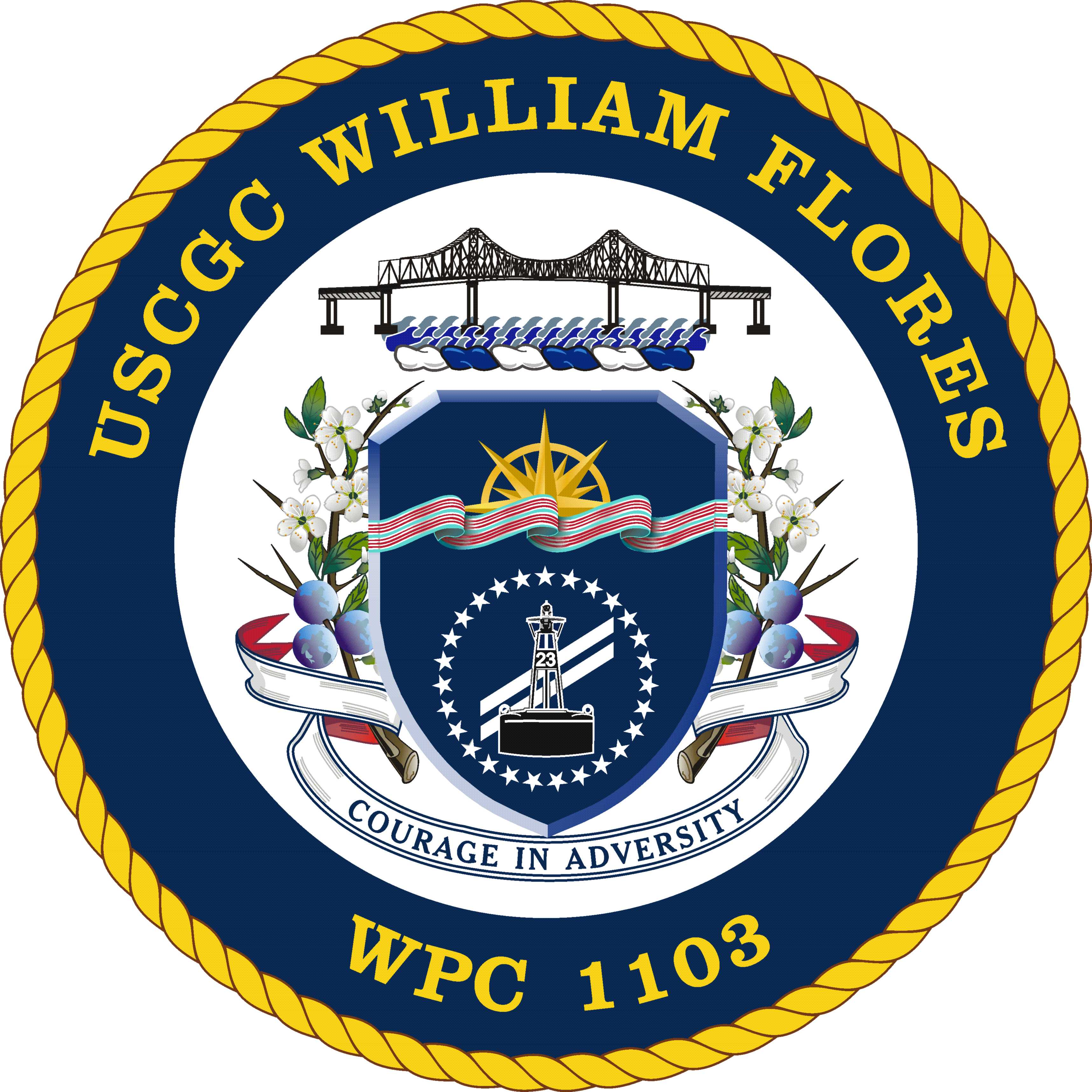
- Badge

General characteristics
- Class & type: Sentinel-class cutter
- Displacement: 353 long tons (359 t)
- Length: 46.8 m (154 ft)
- Beam: 8.11 m (26.6 ft)
- Depth: 2.9 m (9.5 ft)
- Propulsion: 2 × 4,300 kW (5,800 shp); 1 × 75 kW (101 shp) bow thruster
- Speed: 28 knots (52 km/h; 32 mph)
- Range: 2,500 nmi (4,600 km; 2,900 mi)
- Endurance: 5 days
- Boats & landing craft carried: 1 × Cutter Boat - Over the Horizon OTH-IV
- Complement: 4 officers, 20 crew
- Sensors & processing systems: L-3 C4ISR suite
- Armament: 1 × Mk 38 Mod 2 25 mm automatic gun; 4 × Browning M2 .50 cal machine guns; Various small arms

USCGC William Flores (WPC-1103) is a Sentinel-class cutter homeported in Coast Guard District 7, Miami, Florida.

== Design ==
Like her sister ships, she is equipped for coastal security patrols, interdiction of drug and people smugglers, and search and rescue. Like the smaller Marine Protector class she is equipped with a stern launching ramp. The ramp allows the deployment and retrieval of her high speed water-jet powered pursuit boat without first coming to a stop. She is capable of more than 25 knots (46 km/h; 29 mph) and armed with a remote controlled 25 millimetres (0.98 in) M242 Bushmaster autocannon; and four crew-served Browning M2 machine guns.

== Operational history ==
On 1 April 2016, William Flores intercepted a small boat with twelve Cuban refugees on board. The refugees had gone off course, and had entered Bahamas territory.

== Namesake ==
She is named after seaman apprentice William Flores, who died during the sinking of USCGC Blackthorn in 1980. At the cost of his own life, Flores stayed aboard the capsizing cutter and used his belt to tie open a life jacket locker door. This action allowed life jackets to float on to the water as the cutter went down. He further distributed life jackets to shipmates in the water. In November 2011, Flores was honored by having the third Coast Guard Sentinel-class cutter named after him.
