= Coast Guard Medal =

Decoration of the United States military

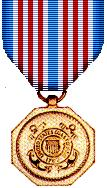
- Type: Military medal
- Awarded for: "Distinguishing oneself by heroism not involving actual conflict with an enemy."
- Presented by: United States Department of Homeland Security
- Status: Currently awarded
- Established: 4 August 1949
- First award: 18 March 1958
- Final award: 26 March 2019
- Service ribbon

Precedence
- Next (higher): Distinguished Flying Cross
- Equivalent: Army: Soldier's Medal; Naval Service: Navy and Marine Corps Medal; Air and Space Forces: Airman's Medal
- Next (lower): Bronze Star Medal

The Coast Guard Medal is a decoration of the United States military that is awarded to any service member who, while serving in any capacity with the United States Coast Guard, distinguishes themselves by heroism not involving actual conflict with an enemy. For the decoration to be awarded, an individual must have performed a voluntary act of heroism in the face of great personal danger or of such a magnitude that it stands out distinctly above normal expectations.

The Coast Guard Medal was first authorized by 14 U.S.C. § 2739 on 4 August 1949, but it was not until 1958 that the medal was actually bestowed. The first recipients of the Coast Guard Medal were FN Earl H. Leyda and BM3 Albert Raymond Johnson who were awarded the decoration in March 1958. The citation for the Coast Guard Medal was for actions performed in August 1957 while attempting to rescue trapped workers from the Oswego Water Works Tunnel, under Lake Ontario, in Oswego, New York.

Additional awards of the Coast Guard Medal are annotated by 5/16 inch gold stars. The Coast Guard Medal is the equivalent to the Army's Soldier's Medal, the Navy and Marine Corps Medal, and the Air and Space Forces' Airman's Medal.

== Notable recipients ==
- Richard R. Callahan
- Edgar Culbertson
- Richard Dixon
- William Flores
- Michael P. Leavitt
- David M. Lorange
- Ronald C. Prei
- Terrell E. Horne
- Tristan Heaton
- Jacob Poroo
- Robert Earl Hill
- Traci Huddleston
- Tracy Mannes
- Michael D. Gray

== See also ==
- Awards and decorations of the United States military
