= International Ship Masters' Association =

- Founded: 1886; 140 years ago
- Location: United States, Canada
- Website: https://www.shipmaster.org/

The International Ship Masters' Association was established in 1886 as the Excelsior Marine Benevolent Association. It changed its name in 1893 to the Ship Masters' Association. This was a society among members of the profession, where in case of death of a member the widow or beneficiary would receive $100.00.
