= William Richard Arnold (bishop) =

Chief of Chaplains of the United States Army

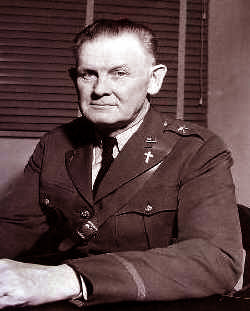
- Brigadier General Arnold, circa 1942
- Born: June 10, 1881; Wooster, Ohio, U.S.
- Died: January 7, 1965 (aged 83); New York, New York, U.S.
- Burial place: Arlington National Cemetery
- Military career
- Branch: United States Army
- Service years: 1913–1965
- Rank: Major general
- Commands: U.S. Army Chaplain Corps
- Conflicts: World War I; World War II
- Awards: Distinguished Service Medal
- Church: Catholic (Latin Church)
- Diocese: Military Ordinariate of United States of America
- Other post: Titular bishop of Phocaea

Orders
- Ordination: June 13, 1908 (priesthood)
- Consecration: October 11, 1945 by Francis Spellman, John F. Noll, and John Francis O'Hara

William Richard Arnold (June 10, 1881 – January 7, 1965) was an American Army officer and bishop of the Roman Catholic Church. He served as the 5th Chief of Chaplains of the United States Army from 1937 to 1945 and Military Delegate of the Armed Forces from 1945 until his death in 1965.

== Biography ==
=== Early life and education ===
William Arnold was born in Wooster, Ohio, to Augustine Adam and Catherine Mary (née Dalton) Arnold. He attended St. Joseph's College in Rensselaer, Indiana, graduating in 1902. Before beginning his studies for the priesthood, he learned his father's trade of cigar-making and later worked as a bar-straightener at a steel mill in Muncie. In Peru, Indiana, he became acquainted and quartered with the Hagenbeck-Wallace Circus.

Arnold then studied at St. Bernard's Seminary in Rochester, New York.

=== Ordination and ministry ===
Arnold was ordained a priest for the Diocese of Fort Wayne on June 13, 1908. His first assignment was as a curate at St. Charles Borromeo Church in Peru. In April 1913, he entered the Army Chaplain Corps with the rank of first lieutenant. Arnold then served at Fort Washington, Maryland, until 1915, when he was sent to Fort Mills at Corregidor in the Philippines. Returning to the United States in 1918, he briefly served at Fort Winfield Scott in California, and taught at the Chaplain Training School at Camp Taylor in Louisville, Kentucky.

Arnold subsequently served at Fort Hancock in New Jersey (1918–19), and was promoted to captain in May 1919. He was director of the Chaplain Training School at Fort Leavenworth in Kansas from 1925 to 1929 and named a major in April 1927. He then returned to the Philippines, serving as department chaplain at Fort McKinley from 1929 to 1931. After serving at Fort Bliss in Texas from 1931 to 1937, he was chaplain of the First Cavalry Division and supervising chaplain of the Arizona, New Mexico, West Texas District of the Civilian Conservation Corps. He was promoted to lieutenant colonel in April 1933, and served again as director of the Chaplain Training School at Fort Leavenworth from June to November 1937.

=== Chief of the Army Chaplain Corps ===
Chaplain Arnold served two terms (8 years) as Chief of the Army Chaplain Corps and led the greatest transformation of the Army Chaplaincy. On December 23, 1937, Arnold was appointed Chief of the Army Chaplain Corps by President Franklin D. Roosevelt, with the rank of colonel. He was the first Catholic to hold the office. He was named a papal chamberlain by Pope Pius XI in August 1938, and raised to the rank of domestic prelate by Pope Pius XII in January 1942. He became a brigadier general on November 21, 1941, and was re-appointed Chief of Chaplains on December 23 of that year. Arnold was promoted to the rank of major general on November 17, 1944. He continued to serve as Chief of Chaplains until April 1, 1945, when he became Assistant Inspector General of the Army.

=== Contributions to music ===
Arnold felt that music was essential to Army chaplaincy and delegated the authority for editing a new hymnal, The Hymnal Army and Navy, to Ivan L. Bennett (later to become Chief of Chaplains 1952–1954), to replace The Army and Navy Hymnal (1920) edited by John B. Frazier and Julian E. Yates. He also felt that the Chaplain Corps should have their own march, an effort that resulted in the "Soldiers of God," with stirring music composed by Ben Machan and lyrics by Private Hy Zaret.

=== Military Delegate of the Armed Forces ===
On May 5, 1945, Arnold was appointed Military Delegate of the Armed Forces and Titular Bishop of Phocaea by Pius XII. He received his episcopal consecration on the following October 11 from Archbishop Francis Spellman, with Bishops John F. Noll and John Francis O'Hara serving as co-consecrators, at St. Patrick's Cathedral. He traveled extensively during his 19-year tenure, visiting American military installations throughout the world and administering the sacraments to members of the armed services and their families.

Arnold died at St. Clare's Hospital in New York City, at age 83.

== See also ==
- Catholic Church hierarchy
- Catholic Church in the United States
- Historical list of the Catholic bishops of the United States
- Insignia of chaplain schools in the United States military
- List of Catholic bishops of the United States
- List of Catholic bishops of the United States: military service
- Lists of patriarchs, archbishops, and bishops
- Military chaplain
- Religious symbolism in the United States military
- United States military chaplains

Catholic Church titles
| Preceded by John Francis O'Hara | Apostolic Vicar for the U.S. Armed Forces; May 15, 1945 – January 7, 1965 | Succeeded by Terence Cooke |
Military offices
| Preceded by Alva J. Brasted | Chief of Chaplains of the United States Army; 1937–1945 | Succeeded by Luther D. Miller |
