= John R. McNamara =

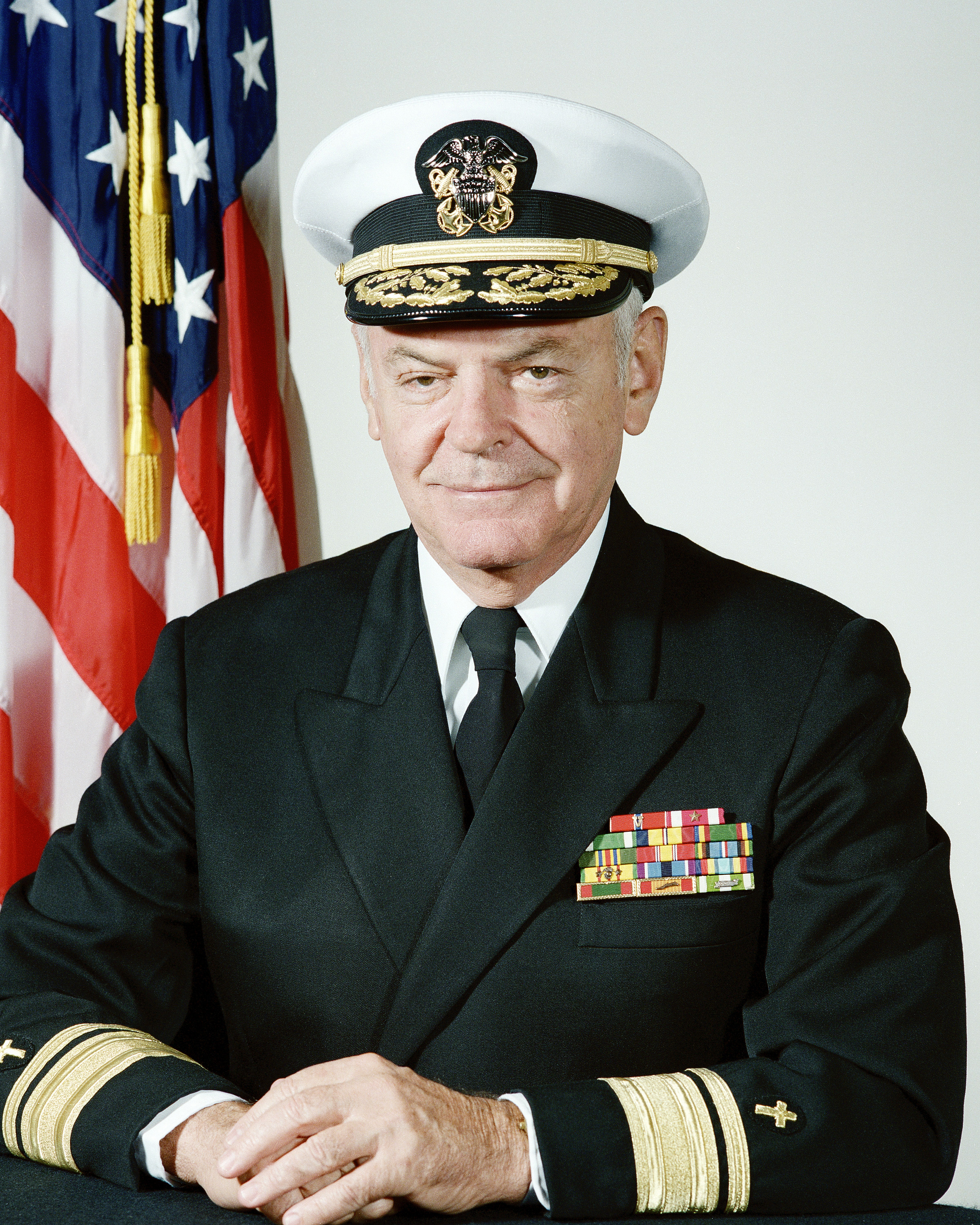
- Born: September 4, 1927; Boston, Massachusetts
- Died: April 16, 2001 (aged 73); Brighton, Massachusetts
- Alma mater: College of the Holy Cross (BA); Saint John's Seminary (MA)
- Military career
- Allegiance: USA
- Branch: United States Navy
- Rank: Rear Admiral

Chaplain (Rear Admiral) John Richard McNamara, USN (September 4, 1927 – April 16, 2001) was an American Navy officer who served as the 17th Chief of Chaplains of the United States Navy from 1985 to 1988. He was awarded the Bronze Star for service with the U.S. Marine Corps in Vietnam.

== Background ==
Born in Boston, Massachusetts, McNamara earned a B.A. degree from the College of the Holy Cross in 1948 and a M.A. degree from Saint John's Seminary in 1952. He was ordained to the priesthood for the Roman Catholic Archdiocese of Boston by Archbishop Richard Cushing on January 10, 1952. On April 12, 1992, McNamara was named titular bishop of 'Risinium' and auxiliary bishop of the Boston Archdiocese and was ordained on May 21, 1992. He chose To echo Christ as his episcopal motto. He resigned on October 12, 1999, and died on April 16, 2001.

== Military career ==
McNamara was commissioned in the United States Naval Reserve on May 7, 1962. He ministered to the 3rd Marine Division in Okinawa and Vietnam from June 1965 to March 1966. McNamara later served aboard USS Kitty Hawk and USS Oklahoma City. He was promoted to commodore on December 1, 1983.

== See also ==
Military offices
| Preceded by Neil M. Stevenson | Chief of Chaplains of the United States Navy; 1985–1988 | Succeeded by Alvin B. Koeneman |
