= Admiral White =

Admiral White may refer to:

- David E. White (born 1938), U.S. Navy rear admiral
- Hugo White (1939–2014), British Royal Navy admiral
- John Chambers White (c. 1770–1845), British Royal Navy vice admiral
- Jonathan White (admiral) (born c. 1957), U.S. Navy admiral
- Peter White (Royal Navy officer) (1919–2010), British Royal Navy admiral
- Steven A. White (1928–2021), U.S. Navy admiral
- Timothy J. White (fl. 1980s–2020s), U.S. Navy vice admiral

== See also ==
- Admiral of the White, a former senior rank of the British Royal Navy
- White admiral (disambiguation)
