= Barry Black =

United States Navy admiral and Seventh-Day Adventist minister (born 1948)

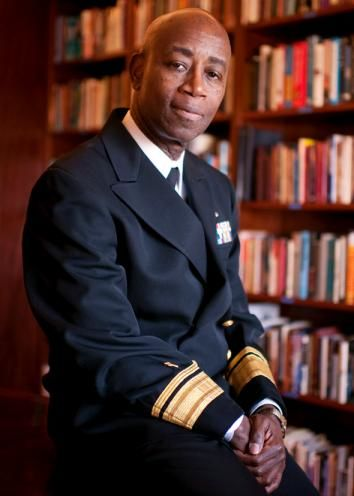

62nd Chaplain of the United States Senate
- Incumbent
- Assumed office July 7, 2003
- President: George W. Bush; Barack Obama; Donald Trump; Joe Biden; Donald Trump
- Preceded by: Lloyd Ogilvie

22nd Chief of Chaplains of the United States Navy
- In office August 2000 – August 15, 2003
- Preceded by: Byron Holderby
- Succeeded by: Louis Iasiello

Personal details
- Born: Barry Clayton Black; November 1, 1948 (age 78) Baltimore, Maryland, U.S.
- Spouse: Brenda Pearsall (m. 1973)
- Children: 3
- Education: Oakwood University (BA); Andrews University (MDiv); North Carolina Central University (MA); Palmer Theological Seminary (DMin); Salve Regina University (MA); Alliant International University (PhD)

Military service
- Allegiance: United States
- Branch/service: United States Navy
- Years of service: 1976–2003
- Rank: Rear Admiral
- Awards: Navy Distinguished Service Medal; Legion of Merit; Defense Meritorious Service Medal (2); Meritorious Service Medal (2); Navy Commendation Medal (2); Marine Corps Commendation Medal
- Barry Black's voice Barry Black opens the Senate with a prayer following the Nashville school shooting Recorded March 28, 2023

Barry Clayton Black (born November 1, 1948) is the 62nd chaplain of the United States Senate. He began serving as Senate chaplain on June 27, 2003, becoming the first African American and first Seventh-day Adventist to hold the office.

Black served for over 27 years in the United States Navy Chaplain Corps, rising to the rank of rear admiral (upper half) and ending his career as the Chief of Chaplains of the United States Navy. He retired from the Navy on August 15, 2003.

== Naval career ==
Commissioned as a Navy chaplain in 1976, Black's first duty station was the Fleet Religious Support Activity in Norfolk, Virginia. Subsequent assignments included Naval Support Activity, Philadelphia, Pennsylvania; U.S. Naval Academy, Annapolis, Maryland; First Marine Aircraft Wing, Okinawa, Japan; Naval Training Center, San Diego, California; USS Belleau Wood (LHA-3), Long Beach, California; Naval Chaplains School Advanced Course, Newport, Rhode Island; Marine Aircraft Group Thirty-One, Beaufort, South Carolina; assistant staff chaplain, chief of naval education and training, Pensacola, Florida; and fleet chaplain, U.S. Atlantic Fleet, Norfolk, Virginia.

As a rear admiral, he received the Navy Distinguished Service Medal, the Legion of Merit Medal, the Defense Meritorious Service Medal twice, the Meritorious Service Medal twice, the Navy Commendation Medal twice, the Marine Corps Commendation Medal, and numerous unit awards, campaign, and service medals.

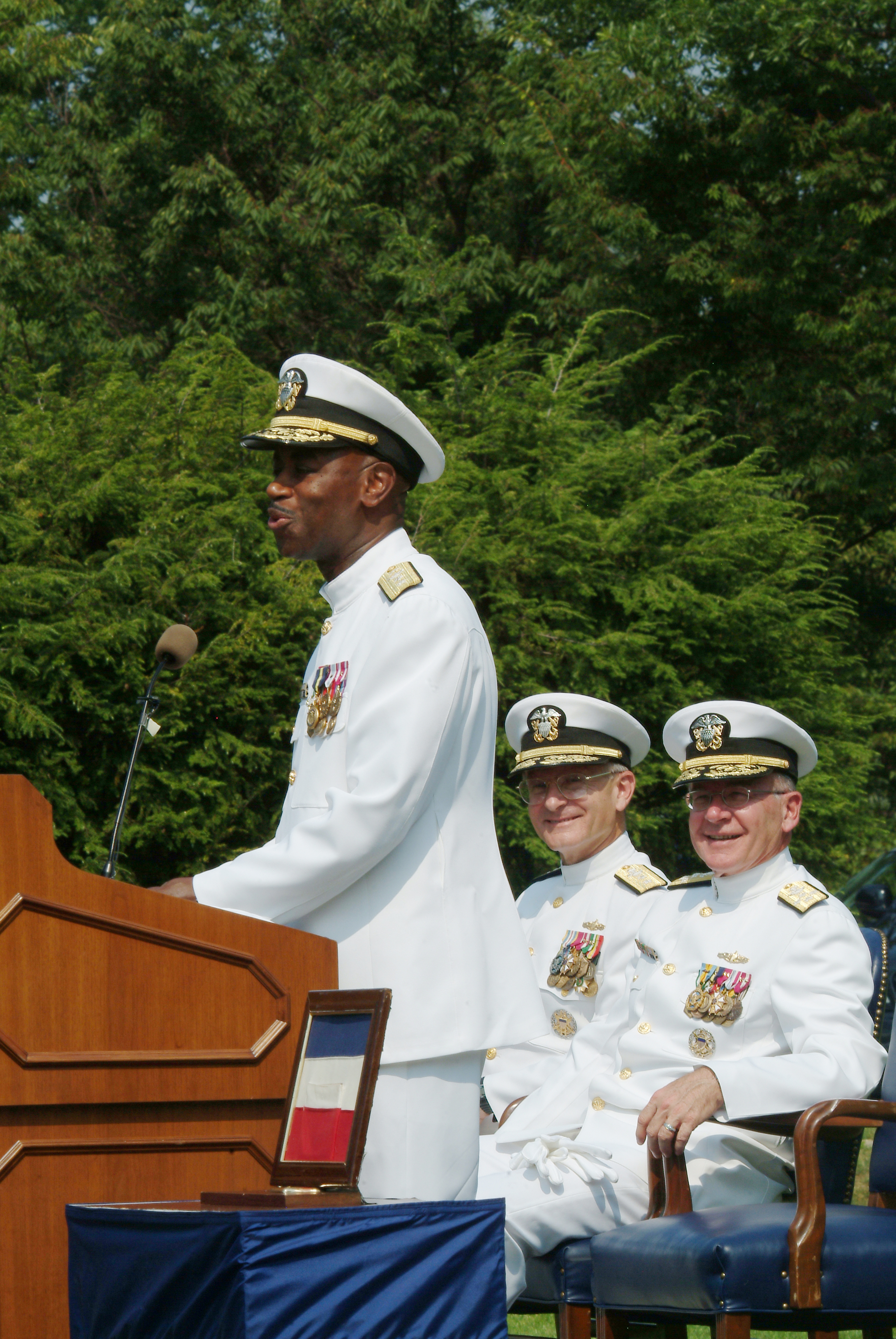
Rear Adm. Barry C. Black, chief of navy chaplains remarks after receiving the Navy Distinguished Service Medal from Adm. Vern Clark, chief of naval operations (CNO). Sitting (center) and next to the CNO, Rear Adm. Christopher E. Weaver, commandant, Naval District Washington, during the change of office and retirement ceremony at the Washington Navy Yard, August 15, 2003

== United States Senate chaplain ==
On June 27, 2003, Black was chosen as the 62nd chaplain of the U.S. Senate. He began the job on July 7, 2003. Black has the longest consecutive tenure among Senate chaplains.

During the 16-day United States federal government shutdown of 2013, Black's invocations began to garner widespread national attention. On October 1, the first day of the shutdown, he prayed for divine guidance to "strengthen our weakness, replacing cynicism with faith and cowardice with courage". On October 3, he prayed, "Save us from the madness. We acknowledge our transgressions, our shortcomings, our smugness, our selfishness and our pride... Deliver us from the hypocrisy of attempting to sound reasonable while being unreasonable."

During his prayer on October 4, the day after officers from the U.S. Capitol Police shot and killed a woman who had used her car in an attempt to breach federal grounds, Black noted that the officers were not being paid because of the shutdown. Like other government workers, he too was unpaid during the shutdown, saying, "I'm being remunerated from above. And that's pretty special." On the fourth day of the shutdown, he also prayed, of the senators, "Remove from them that stubborn pride which imagines itself to be above and beyond criticism. Forgive them the blunders they have committed."

On day nine, prompted by news of the delay of death benefits for military families, Black prayed, "It's time for our lawmakers to say 'Enough is enough'", and asked that God "cover our shame with the robe of Your righteousness". On day 11, Black prayed to "give our lawmakers the wisdom to distinguish between truth and error... Give them a hatred of all hypocrisy, deceit and shame as they seek to replace them with gentleness, patience and truth."

The U.S. House of Representatives, which has its own chaplain, also invited Black to deliver an invocation in their chamber.

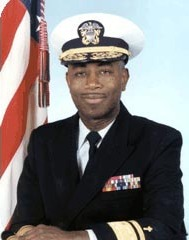
Rear Adm. Barry C. Black, chief of chaplains of the U.S. Navy

== Awards ==
In 1995, Black was chosen from 127 nominees for the NAACP Renowned Service Award for his contributions to equal opportunity and civil rights.

In 2002, he received the Benjamin Elijah Mays Distinguished Leadership Award from the Morehouse School of Religion. In 2004, the Old Dominion University chapter of the NAACP conferred on him the Image Award, "Reaffirming the Dream - Realizing the Vision", for military excellence.

On May 23, 2019, Black was awarded the Becket's 2019 Canterbury Medal for his defense of religious liberty for people of all faiths.

== Education ==
Black is an alumnus of Oakwood University, Andrews University, North Carolina Central University, Eastern Baptist Seminary (now known as Palmer Theological Seminary), Salve Regina University, and the United States International University (now known as Alliant International University).

In addition to earning three Master of Arts degrees in divinity, counseling, and management, Black holds two earned doctorates: a Doctorate of Ministry and a Ph.D. in psychology. In 2004, he also received an honorary Doctorate of Divinity degree from La Sierra University.

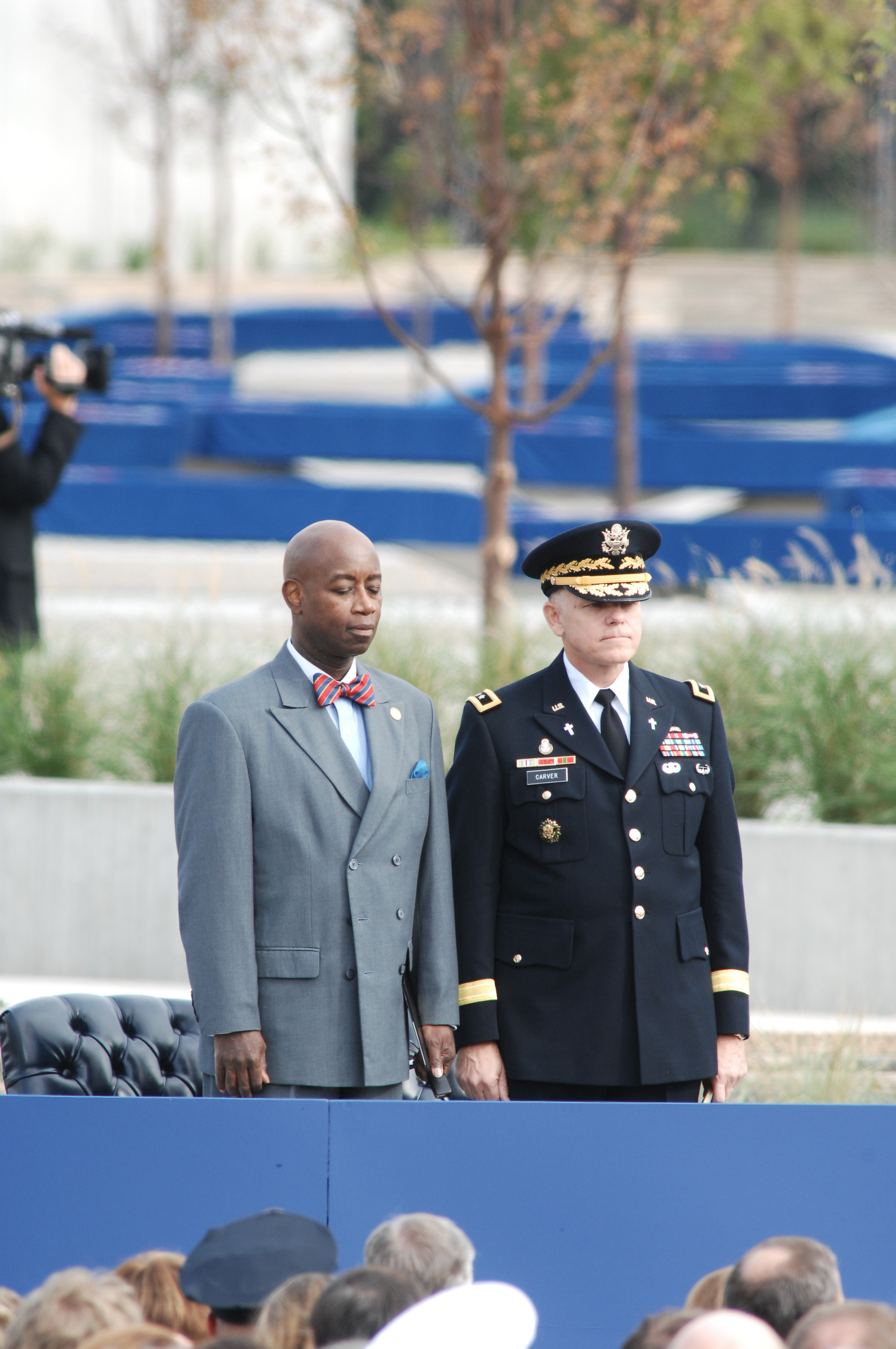
Rear Adm. Barry C. Black, USN (Ret.), (left), the chaplain of the U.S. Senate, and Maj. Gen. Douglas L. Carver, the U.S. Army chief of chaplains, take their places on the dais at the Pentagon Memorial dedication ceremony, Sep 11, 2008

== Publication ==
Black's autobiography, From the Hood to the Hill, was published in 2006. He has explained its title as follows:

One of the reasons why I call my book From the Hood to the Hill is because we grew up in the hood. We grew up in the toxic pathology of an inner city ghetto. There were prostitutes on the corner, there were drug pushers, there was domestic violence that you could see sitting on the steps – of your home. So, it was a very challenging situation. And my mother, who for a significant portion of my life was on public assistance, would often have difficulty paying the rent and ensuring that her children matriculated at Christian schools because my seven siblings and I all matriculated at Christian schools from grade 1 all the way through graduate school. So, to pull this off, many times she couldn't pay the rent, and when you don't pay the rent, you will be evicted. And so, three times in my life, I came home from my nice Christian school to find our furniture out on the street.

== In popular culture ==
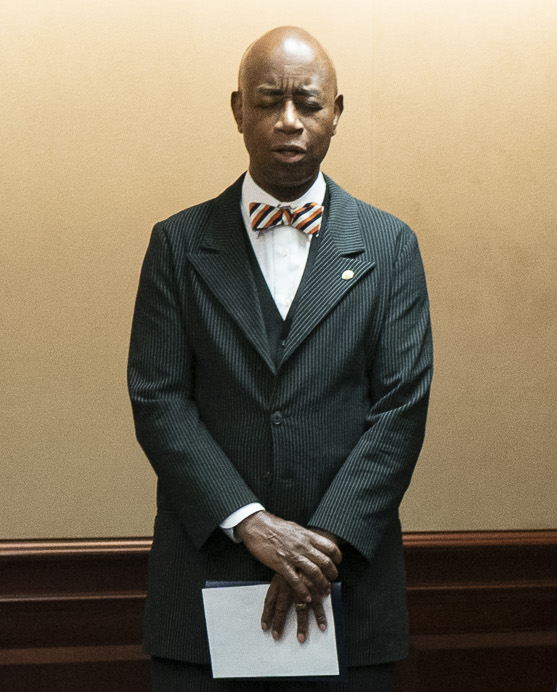
Barry Black on 26 March 2020 at Governors' Video Teleconference on Partnership for the COVID-19 Response

As a result of the attention his invocations received during the federal government shutdown, Black was parodied on NBC's Saturday Night Live. Playing Black during the show's "Weekend Update" segment that aired on October 12, 2013, SNL cast member Kenan Thompson prayed, "Lord, bless and forgive these braying jackasses." Thompson's Black prayed, "May they find themselves in a restroom stall devoid of toilet paper."

When approached for a reaction, Black responded that, while he had not seen it, he was a fan of the show and did not object to the parody. "It's all in good humor", he said. "If you're doing something constructive enough that you're part of their cartoons, that's a great honor."

== Personal life ==
Black is a native of Baltimore, Maryland. His mother was a domestic worker and his father was a long-distance truck driver "and something of a nomad". He is one of eight children.

He is married to Brenda Black, née Pearsall, of St. Petersburg, Florida. They have three sons: Barry II, Brendan, and Bradford.

Black is a Seventh-day Adventist and vegetarian. He has said, "that is not something that is a test of fellowship in my church. I'm a vegetarian because I grew up that way and I believe it's a rather healthy lifestyle."

Military offices
Preceded by Byron Holderby	Chief of Chaplains of the United States Navy; 2000–2003	Succeeded by Louis Iasiello
Religious titles
Preceded by Lloyd J. Ogilvie	Chaplain of the United States Senate; 2003–present	Incumbent
