= Donald K. Muchow =

American Navy officer (born 1937)

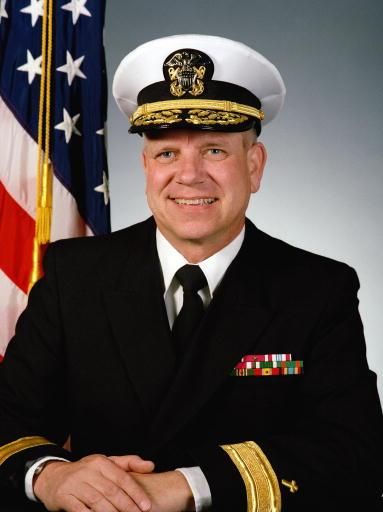
- Born: October 20, 1937 (age 88); Framingham, Massachusetts
- Military career
- Allegiance: United States
- Branch: United States Navy
- Rank: Rear admiral
- Commands: Chief of Chaplains of the United States Navy
- Awards: Navy Distinguished Service Medal; Defense Superior Service Medal; Legion of Merit

Donald K. Muchow (born October 20, 1937) is a former rear admiral and Chief of Chaplains of the United States Navy.

== Early life ==
Muchow was born in Framingham, Massachusetts. He graduated from Concordia Senior College and Concordia Theological Seminary.

== Career ==
Muchow joined the United States Navy in 1964 and was assigned to the USNS Observation Island (T-AGM-23). Later, he was stationed at Marine Corps Air Station Cherry Point and Marine Corps Base Camp Lejeune.

After serving with Destroyer Squadron 22, Muchow was stationed at Naval Hospital Philadelphia. Muchow then served aboard the USS Iwo Jima (LPH-2) before being transferred to the 9th Marine Regiment in Japan. Later, he was assigned to the Rapid Deployment Joint Task Force and the United States Central Command.

Muchow was Deputy Chief of Chaplains from 1991 until 1994, when he became Chief of Chaplains. He remained in the position until his retirement in 1997.

Awards he received during his career include the Navy Distinguished Service Medal, the Defense Superior Service Medal and the Legion of Merit.

== Personal life ==
In 1960, he married Monie Eberhard. They have two children.

After retirement, Muchow moved to Buda, Texas. In 2010, he began volunteering as Chaplain to the Buda Police Department.

He was selected as the 2024 City of Buda "Local Legend" for his lifetime commitment of service including his service as Chaplain for the Buda Police Department and for leading the Buda Ministerial Alliance.
