= Robert D. Workman =

U.S. Navy chief of chaplains

Chief of Chaplains Robert D. Workman
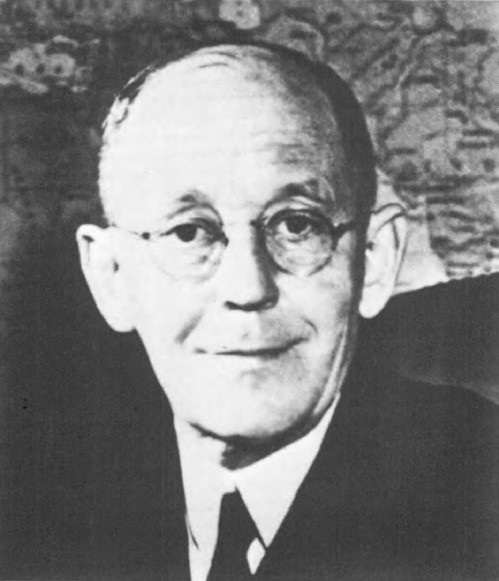
- Born: June 7, 1885; Zanesville, Ohio, U.S.
- Died: June 20, 1977 (aged 92); West Chester, Pennsylvania, U.S.
- Spouse: Elisabeth Stewart Workman
- Children: 2 daughters
- Military career
- Allegiance: United States of America
- Branch: Marine Corps (1905–1909); Navy (1915–1947)
- Rank: Rear Admiral
- Unit: Navy Chaplains Corps
- Commands: Chief of Chaplains of the U.S. Navy
- Awards: Legion of Merit

Robert DuBois Workman (June 7, 1885 – June 20, 1977) was the U.S. Navy chief of chaplains during most of World War II from 1937 to 1945 and oversaw an increase of chaplains from less than 90 to more than 2800. He was of the Presbyterian faith. Workman was the first Chief of Chaplains to be promoted to rear admiral while still on active duty.

On February 28, 1905, Workman enlisted in the Marine Corps. He served four years there before enrolling at the College of Wooster. Workman graduated in 1913 and then entered the Princeton Theological Seminary. In May 1915, he entered the chaplain corps as a lieutenant junior grade. Workman served aboard the USS Ohio, the USS Florida, the USS Mohican, the USS North Dakota, the USS Maryland, the USS California, and the USS Nevada. He was promoted to captain on August 25, 1924.

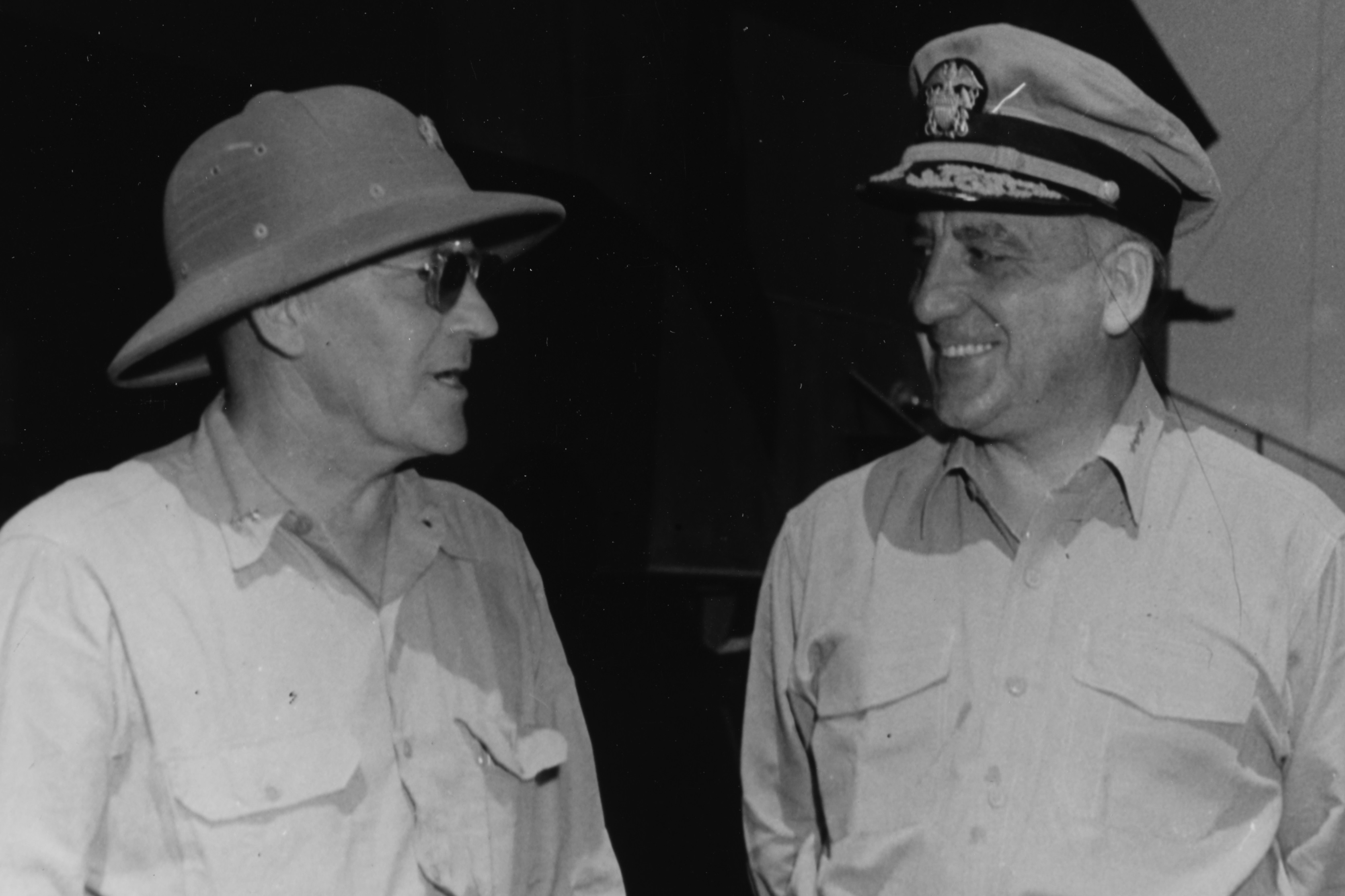
Rear Adm. Workman (left) confers with Vice Adm. Daniel Barbey in April 1945

Workman received a temporary wartime promotion to rear admiral on January 10, 1945. He reverted to his permanent rank of captain when he was reassigned as chaplain for the Third Naval District on August 8, 1945. When Workman retired from the Navy on May 1, 1947, he was advanced to rear admiral on the retired list. Workman lived in La Jolla, California after retirement.

He died on June 20, 1977, at the Chester County Hospital in West Chester, Pennsylvania, at the age of 92. Workman and his wife Elisabeth Stewart Workman (December 8, 1891 – June 27, 1983) are buried in Arlington National Cemetery.
