= Ross H. Trower =

US Navy rear admiral (1922–2014)

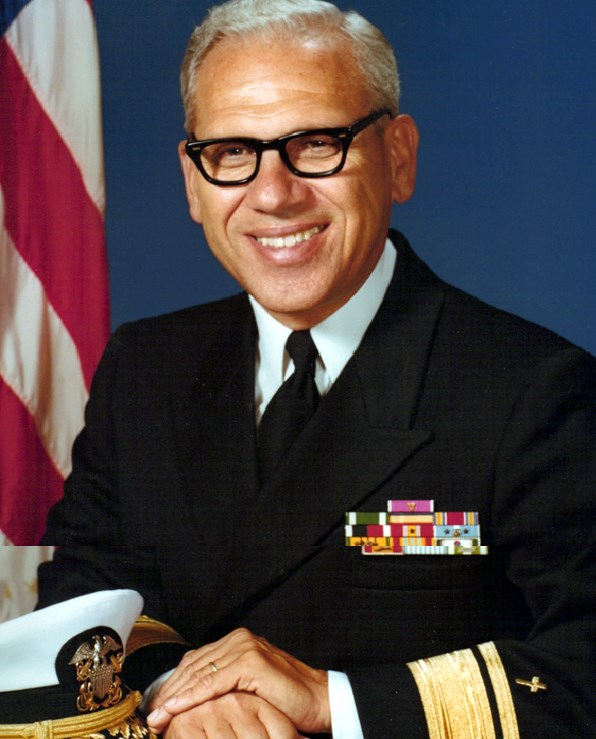
- Born: February 22, 1922; St. Louis, Missouri
- Died: October 31, 2014 (aged 92); Springfield, Virginia
- Military career
- Allegiance: United States
- Branch: United States Navy
- Rank: Rear admiral
- Commands: Chief of Chaplains of the United States Navy
- Awards: Navy Distinguished Service Medal

Ross Henry Trower (February 22, 1922 – October 31, 2014) was a rear admiral and Chief of Chaplains of the United States Navy.

== Biography ==
Trower was born in St. Louis, Missouri. He attended Carthage College (B.A., 1943), the Lutheran School of Theology at Chicago (M.Div., 1945) and Harvard Divinity School (S.T.M., 1954).

On August 20, 1944, Trower married Margaret E. Doering, with whom he would have four children.

He was ordained for the Illinois Synod of the Lutheran Church in America on February 21, 1945.

== Career ==
Trower joined the United States Navy in 1945 and began training at Camp Perry. Afterwards, he was assigned to Naval Station Norfolk. Later, he tended to prisoners of war at Camp Allen. Trower went on to serve aboard the USS Pocono (AGC-16) with the United States Atlantic Fleet.

After serving at Naval Station Great Lakes, Trower was deployed with the 1st Marine Division to serve in the Korean War. Afterwards, he was assigned to the 2nd Marine Division at Marine Corps Base Camp Lejeune.

Trower was later stationed at the Navy Mine Depot, Yorktown and aboard the USS Canberra (CA-70). During his time on the Canberra, Trower entertained Dwight D. Eisenhower during a trip to Bermuda. From there, he served aboard the USS Kitty Hawk (CV-63) and at Naval Hospital Oakland. After being assigned to Naval Air Station North Island and returning for a time to Naval Station Great Lakes, Trower was deployed with the 1st Marine Aircraft Wing to serve in the Vietnam War in 1968. Later, he assisted returning prisoners of war.

After serving as fleet chaplain of the United States Pacific Fleet, Trower was chief of chaplains from 1979 until his retirement in 1983.

Awards he received during his career include the Navy Distinguished Service Medal.

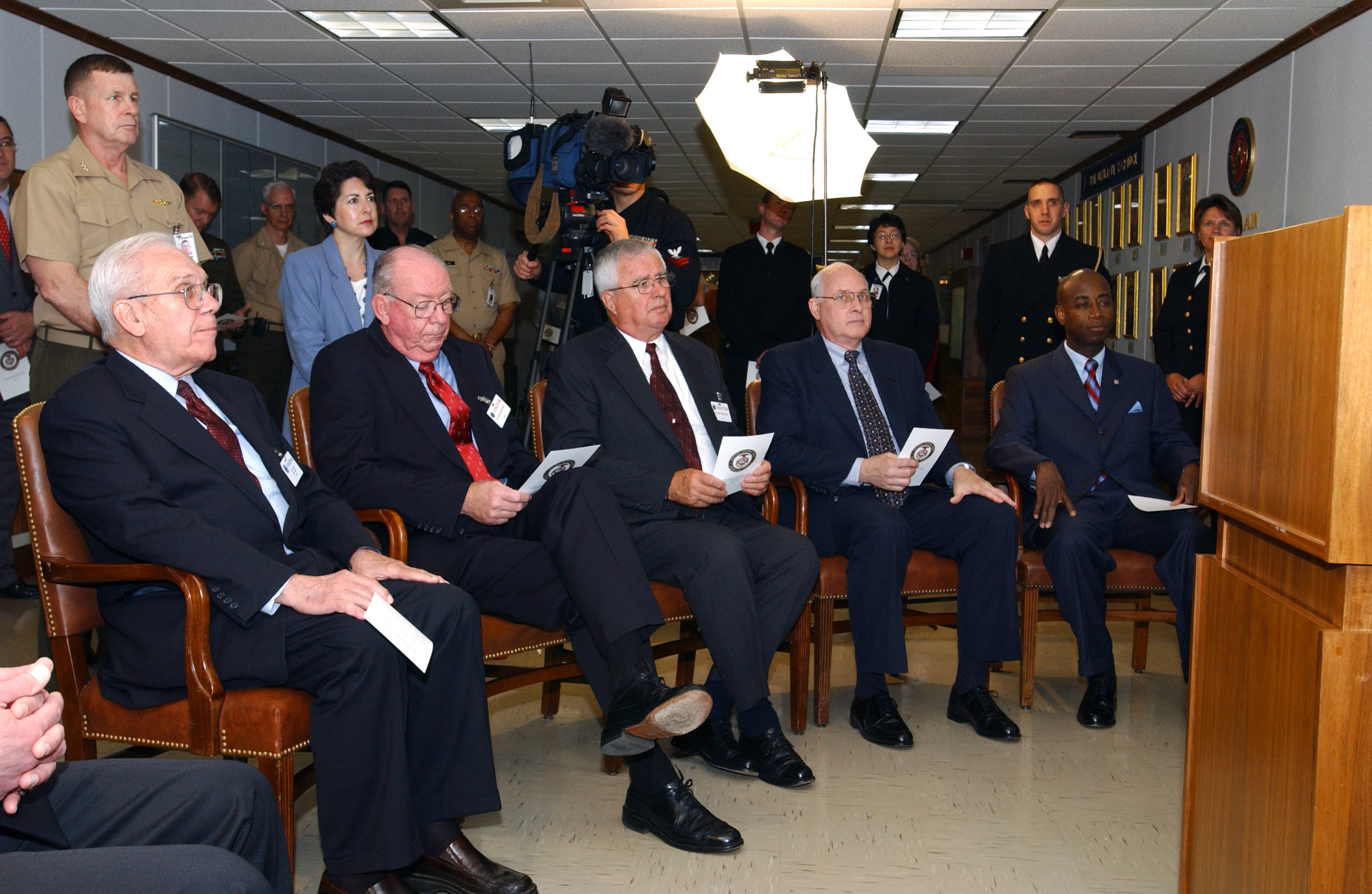
Trower (left) in 2004

== Death ==
Trower died on October 31, 2014. He was interred with his wife Margaret (October 13, 1920 – August 2, 2001) at Arlington National Cemetery.
