= Carey Cash =

21st Chaplain of the United States Marine Corps

Carey H. Cash
- Born: Memphis, Tennessee, U.S.
- Education: The Citadel (BA); Southwestern Baptist Theological Seminary (MDiv); Boston University (MTh); The Catholic University of America (DMin)
- Relatives: Kellye Cash (sister); Johnny Cash (great-uncle)
- Military career
- Allegiance: United States
- Branch: United States Navy
- Rank: Rear Admiral (Lower Half)
- Commands: Chaplain of the Marine Corps
- Awards: Legion of Merit (3); Meritorious Service Medal (4); Navy and Marine Corps Commendation Medal (3)

Carey Hall Cash is a United States Navy Rear Admiral and chaplain who serves as the 29th Chief of Navy Chaplains since May 15, 2026. He previously served as the 21st Chaplain of the Marine Corps. An ordained minister, Cash served in multiple positions as a military chaplain, including as the command chaplain to USS San Jacinto, USS John C. Stennis, and Carrier Strike Group 3, as well as chaplain to former President Barack Obama at Camp David, the U.S. presidential retreat.

== Early life, family and education ==
Cash was born in Memphis, Tennessee, to a religious family. His father, Roy Cash Jr., was a fighter pilot in the Navy for 30 years. His mother, Billie, runs a Christian ministry and is the author of several books about her faith. His older sister, Kellye Cash, was Miss America 1987.

Cash attended The Citadel in South Carolina and Southwestern Baptist Theological Seminary. He is the great-nephew of the singer Johnny Cash.

== Military career ==
Cash served on the battlefield during the 2003 invasion of Iraq. He baptized more than fifty men during the war. In addition, he served as Senior Protestant Chaplain at the United States Naval Academy in Annapolis, Maryland, where he served midshipmen of all faiths with distinction and received Navy citations for his work.

Cash is a chaplain through the Anglican Church in North America's Special Jurisdiction of the Armed Forces and Chaplaincy.

== Awards and qualifications ==
Cash's awards include:

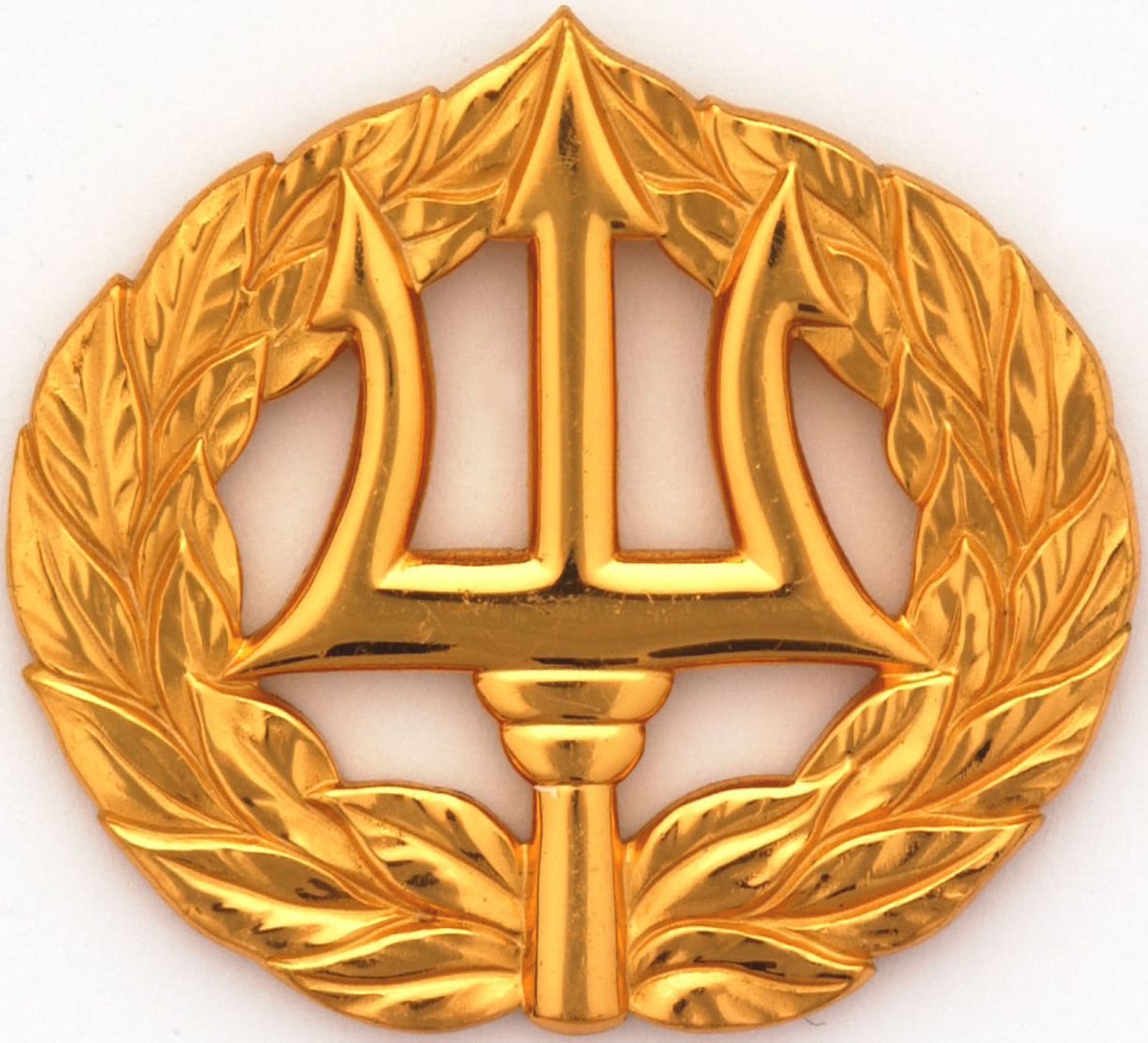

1st row	Legion of Merit with two gold award stars		
2nd row	Meritorious Service Medal with three gold award stars	Navy and Marine Corps Commendation Medal with two award stars	Navy and Marine Corps Achievement Medal with two award stars
3rd row	Navy Combat Action Ribbon	Navy and Marine Corps Presidential Unit Citation	Joint Meritorious Unit Award
4th row	Navy Meritorious Unit Commendation Ribbon	Navy "E" Ribbon w/ one Battle E device	Fleet Marine Force Ribbon
5th row	National Defense Service Medal	Afghanistan Campaign Medal with one bronze campaign star	Iraq Campaign Medal with one bronze campaign star
6th row	Global War on Terrorism Expeditionary Medal with FMF and one bronze campaign star	Global War on Terrorism Service Medal	Navy Sea Service Deployment Ribbon with two bronze campaign stars
7th row	Navy and Marine Corps Overseas Service Ribbon	Navy Accession Training Service Ribbon	NATO Medal (Non-Article 5)
Command pin	Command Ashore insignia		
Badge	Presidential Service Badge		
