= Omro Village Hall and Engine House =

Building in Wisconsin, United States

Coordinates: 44°02′21.3″N 88°44′35.5″W

- U.S. National Register of Historic Places
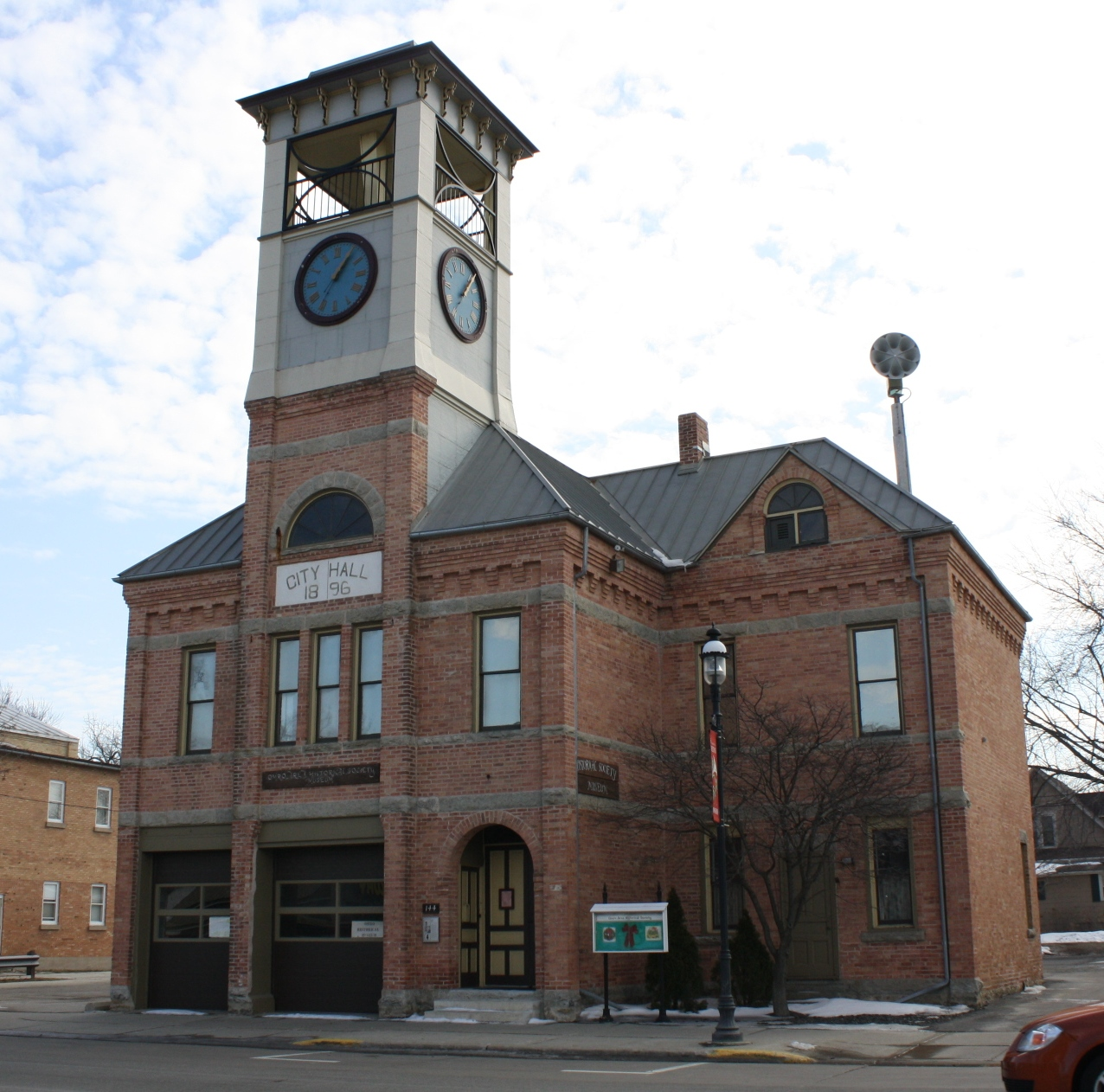
- Omro Village Hall and Engine House
- Location: 144 E. Main St., Omro, Wisconsin
- Built: 1896
- Architect: Fred G. Root
- Architectural style: Queen Anne
- NRHP reference No.: 97000327
- Added to NRHP: April 14, 1997

The Omro Village Hall and Engine House, built in 1896, was the first centralized municipal building in Omro, Wisconsin, and the seat of local government for 70 years. In 1997 it was added to the National Register of Historic Places for its intact Late Victorian architecture and its role in the community.

The first permanent settler at what would become Omro was Edward West, in 1845. By 1848 he had been joined by dozens of other settlers - mostly farmers. Sawmills on the river followed shortly, and in 1849 the village of Omro was platted. In 1857 the village was chartered. More businesses started, and even more after the railroad arrived in 1861. By 1891, Omro's population was 1600.

In that year the village trustees created a fire department, buying a horse-drawn fire engine and two hand-pulled hose carts. This expensive equipment needed protection, so the trustees bought a small frame building to serve as Omro's first fire engine house. At that early date, all the village offices were scattered around town.

A few years later, in 1895, the village board decided to construct a better building "for the use of the fire department, etc." Local builder and architect Fred Root proposed a design in February, 1896. Bids were taken, and by July the building was usable. Thomas Thompson was the masonry contractor and Stanton, Lillicrap and Root were carpentry contractors. The hall was built for $5000.

The building sits on a cut stone foundation, with walls of pink brick rising two stories to a hip roof, which is covered in the original standing seam metal. Above the main block a large square tower rises another two stories, incorporating a four-faced Seth Thomas clock and an open belfry. The belfry holds the original 900-pound bronze fire bell. The vertical emphasis, the asymmetrical massing, and the variety of surface textures are typical elements of Queen Anne architectural style.

Inside, the garage doors led to an engine room on the first floor, where the fire department stored its equipment. To the west, the front room originally housed the village jail, but later the public library. A straight stairway leads to the second floor, which is divided into three rooms. One was the office of the village clerk, containing a walk-in vault which protected the clerk's papers.

The 1896 village hall and engine house was used until 1966, when most of its functions moved to the Omro Theatre building. After that, some wanted to demolish the building to create parking spaces, but that was rejected in a referendum. Instead the building housed some civic organizations until 1981. Since then it has been leased to the Omro Area Historical Society and serves as a museum.
