= Omro, Wisconsin =

- City
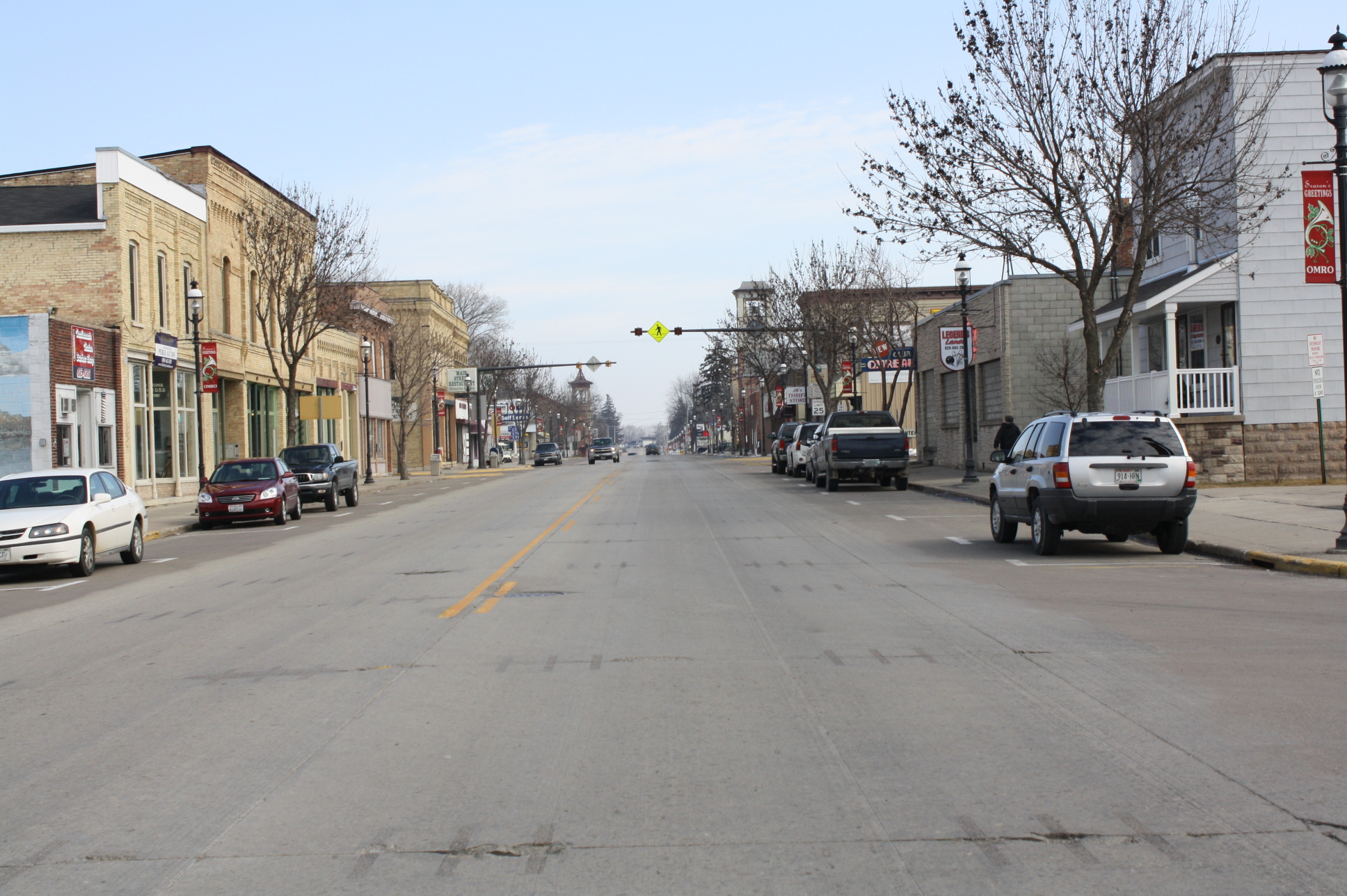
- Looking East at downtown Omro on Hwy 21

- Location of Omro in Winnebago County, Wisconsin.

- Location within Wisconsin Location within the United States
- Coordinates: 44°02′20″N 088°44′30″W
- Country: United States
- State: Wisconsin
- County: Winnebago
- Settled: 1842

Government
  - Type: Mayoral
  - Mayor: Steve Jungwirth

Area
  - Total: 2.57 sq mi (6.65 km^{2})
  - Land: 2.44 sq mi (6.32 km^{2})
  - Water: 0.13 sq mi (0.34 km^{2}) 6.75%
- Elevation: 758 ft (231 m)

Population (2020)
  - Total: 3,652
  - Density: 1,500/sq mi (578/km^{2})
- Time zone: UTC-6 (CST)
  - Summer (DST): UTC-5 (CDT)
- ZIP Code: 54963
- Area code: 920
- FIPS code: 55-59875
- GNIS feature ID: 1576330
- Website: omro-wi.com

Omro is a city in Winnebago County, Wisconsin, United States. The population was 3,652 at the 2020 census. The city is located along the Fox River, approximately 10 miles west of Oshkosh.

== History ==
=== 1853 description ===
OMRO, P. V., on section 17 and 18, in town of Bloomingdale, Winnebago county, at the junction of the Manitowoc and Menasha, (extended), and the Waupun and Liberty Prairie plank roads. It is pleasantly situated on the south side of the Neenah [Fox] river, 11 miles west from Oshkosh, and 75 miles northeast from Madison. It has a heavy body of timber on the north, with a rich soil of openings and prairie on the south, and has excellent facilities by water for obtaining pine logs from the immense pinery of Wolf river, a great quantity of which is here manufactured into lumber. Population 600, with 100 dwellings, 5 stores, 2 hotels, 3 mills, and 4 religious denominations. A Company has been organized and is now completing the proper buildings for the manufacture of glass.

=== History of Omro ===
The area encompassing present day Omro was Winnebago Indian Territory when it was first visited by French explorers in 1639. Omro's location gave it two advantages from the beginning, which were a position on one of the few natural transportation and communications routes of the time and an abundant amount of water for industrial use. The first modern settlers visited in 1847. There are at least three differing accounts of how the town was named. One widely held version is that it was named for Charles Amereau, a French trader and blacksmith who started a fur trading post there.

By 1880, Omro was a stop on the railroad line and was home to the county fairgrounds, several mills, a glass factory, carriage factories, several machine works, and had a population greater than 2,000. Eventually most of the manufacturers either relocated to nearby Oshkosh, or faded away. Since Omro began a revitalization process in 1986, it has seen growth. Several projects pay respects to Omro's past, including a historical walking tour, the Scott park pavilion project, and the designation of a historic downtown district.

== Geography ==
Omro is located at 44°2′20″N 88°44′24″W (44.038959, -88.74014).

According to the United States Census Bureau, the city has a total area of 2.52 square miles (6.53 km^{2}), of which 2.35 square miles (6.09 km^{2}) is land and 0.17 square miles (0.44 km^{2}) is water.

== Demographics ==
Historical population
Census	Pop.	Note	%±
1870	1,838		—
1880	1,476		−19.7%
1890	1,232		−16.5%
1900	1,358		10.2%
1910	1,285		−5.4%
1920	1,042		−18.9%
1930	1,255		20.4%
1940	1,401		11.6%
1950	1,470		4.9%
1960	1,991		35.4%
1970	2,341		17.6%
1980	2,763		18.0%
1990	2,836		2.6%
2000	3,177		12.0%
2010	3,517		10.7%
2020	3,652		3.8%
U.S. Decennial Census

=== 2010 census ===
As of the census of 2010, there were 3,517 people, 1,419 households, and 937 families living in the city. The population density was 1,496.6 inhabitants per square mile (577.8/km^{2}). There were 1,537 housing units at an average density of 654.0 per square mile (252.5/km^{2}). The racial makeup of the city was 96.6% White, 0.7% African American, 0.5% Native American, 0.2% Asian, 1.5% from other races, and 0.6% from two or more races. Hispanic or Latino of any race were 3.3% of the population.

There were 1,419 households, of which 33.7% had children under the age of 18 living with them, 50.9% were married couples living together, 10.4% had a female householder with no husband present, 4.8% had a male householder with no wife present, and 34.0% were non-families. 28.5% of all households were made up of individuals, and 11.2% had someone living alone who was 65 years of age or older. The average household size was 2.43 and the average family size was 2.98.

The median age in the city was 38.8 years. 25.1% of residents were under the age of 18; 6.9% were between the ages of 18 and 24; 27.4% were from 25 to 44; 25.9% were from 45 to 64; and 14.6% were 65 years of age or older. The gender makeup of the city was 49.5% male and 50.5% female.

=== 2000 census ===
As of the census of 2000, there were 3,177 people, 1,236 households, and 847 families living in the city. The population density was 1,420.0 people per square mile (547.6/km^{2}). There were 1,297 housing units at an average density of 579.7 per square mile (223.6/km^{2}). The racial makeup of the city was 97.99% White, 0.19% Black or African American, 0.22% Native American, 0.13% Asian, 0.82% from other races, and 0.66% from two or more races. 2.77% of the population were Hispanic or Latino of any race.

There were 1,236 households, out of which 34.6% had children under the age of 18 living with them, 55.5% were married couples living together, 9.4% had a female householder with no husband present, and 31.4% were non-families. 26.5% of all households were made up of individuals, and 13.3% had someone living alone who was 65 years of age or older. The average household size was 2.49 and the average family size was 3.03.

In the city, the population was spread out, with 26.2% under the age of 18, 6.3% from 18 to 24, 29.7% from 25 to 44, 21.8% from 45 to 64, and 16.0% who were 65 years of age or older. The median age was 37 years. For every 100 females, there were 95.6 males. For every 100 females age 18 and over, there were 91.2 males.

The median income for a household in the city was $45,208, and the median income for a family was $52,143. Males had a median income of $35,701 versus $21,549 for females. The per capita income for the city was $18,332. About 1.5% of families and 3.0% of the population were below the poverty line, including 2.4% of those under age 18 and 6.8% of those age 65 or over.

== Religion ==
Messiah Evangelical Lutheran Church is a member of the Evangelical Lutheran Synod in Omro.

Grace Lutheran Church

First Presbyterian Church

St. Mary's Catholic Church

River of Life Fellowship - non-denominational church

== Notable people ==
- Nelson F. Beckwith, politician
- Gordon R. Bradley, politician
- Merritt L. Campbell, politician
- Frank Challoner, politician
- Leroy S. Chase, politician
- Walter G. Hollander, politician
- Fred L. Holmes, politician
- Andy Jorgensen, politician
- Alvin B. Koeneman, Chief of Chaplains of the United States Navy
- Louis Leroy, MLB player
- Olin B. Lewis, politician
- Sharon Metz, politician
- Alvin E. O'Konski, politician
- Delbert Philpott, soldier and scientist
- Roland W. Reed, artist and photographer
- Thomas A. Roycraft, politician
- Reuben Gold Thwaites, historian

== Images ==
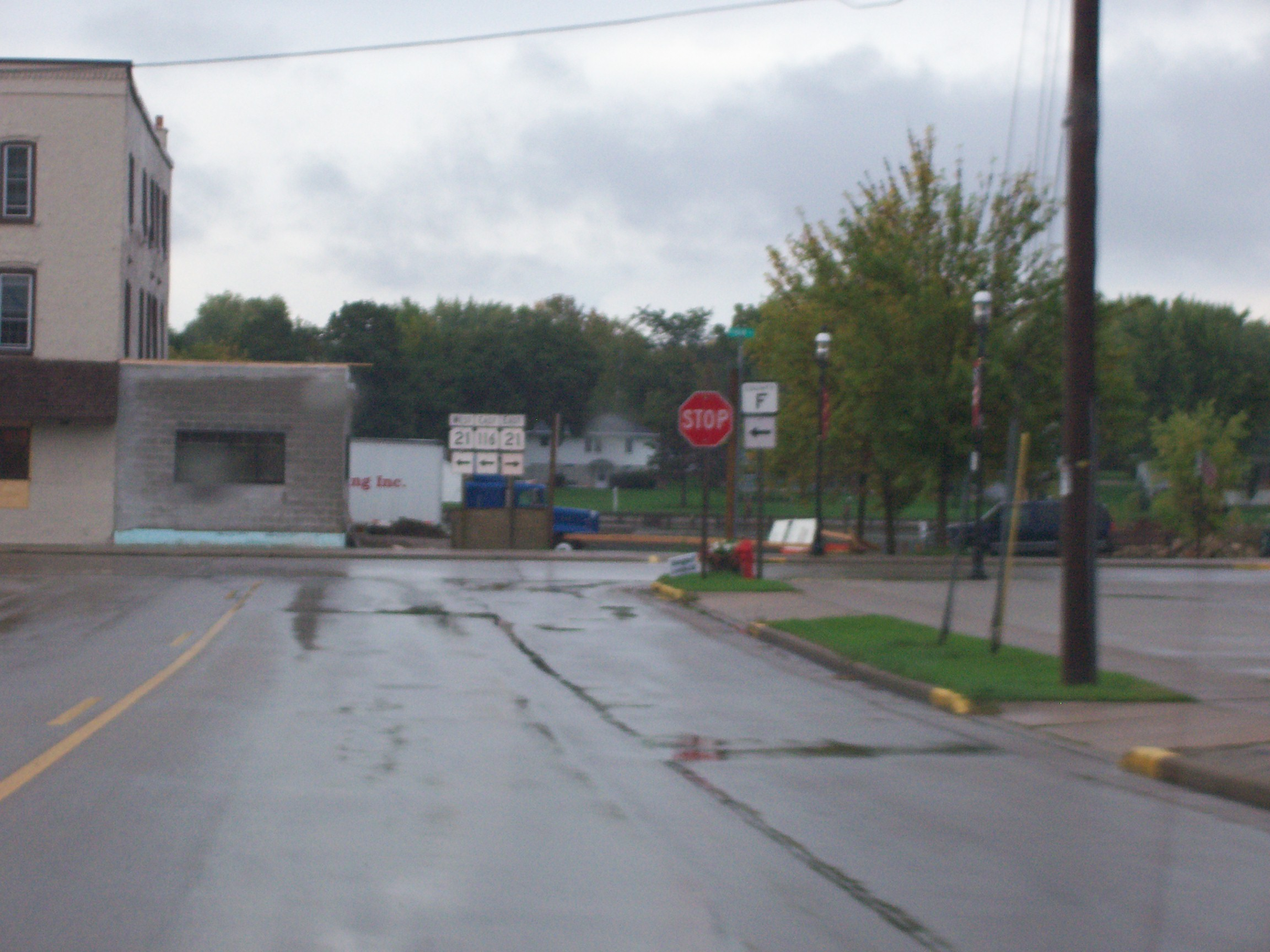
Intersection of Hwy 116 and Hwy 21

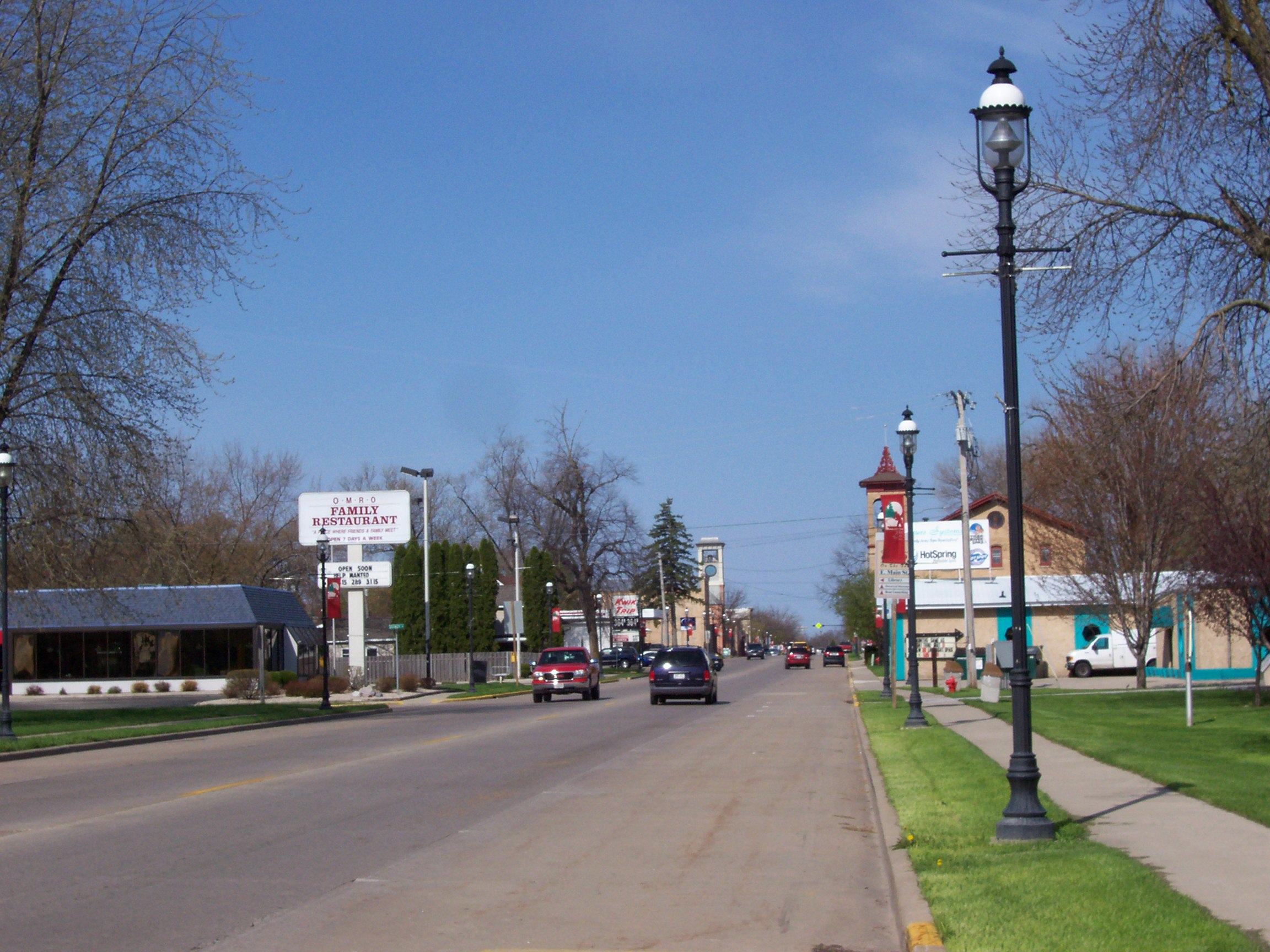
Looking west at downtown Omro on Hwy 21

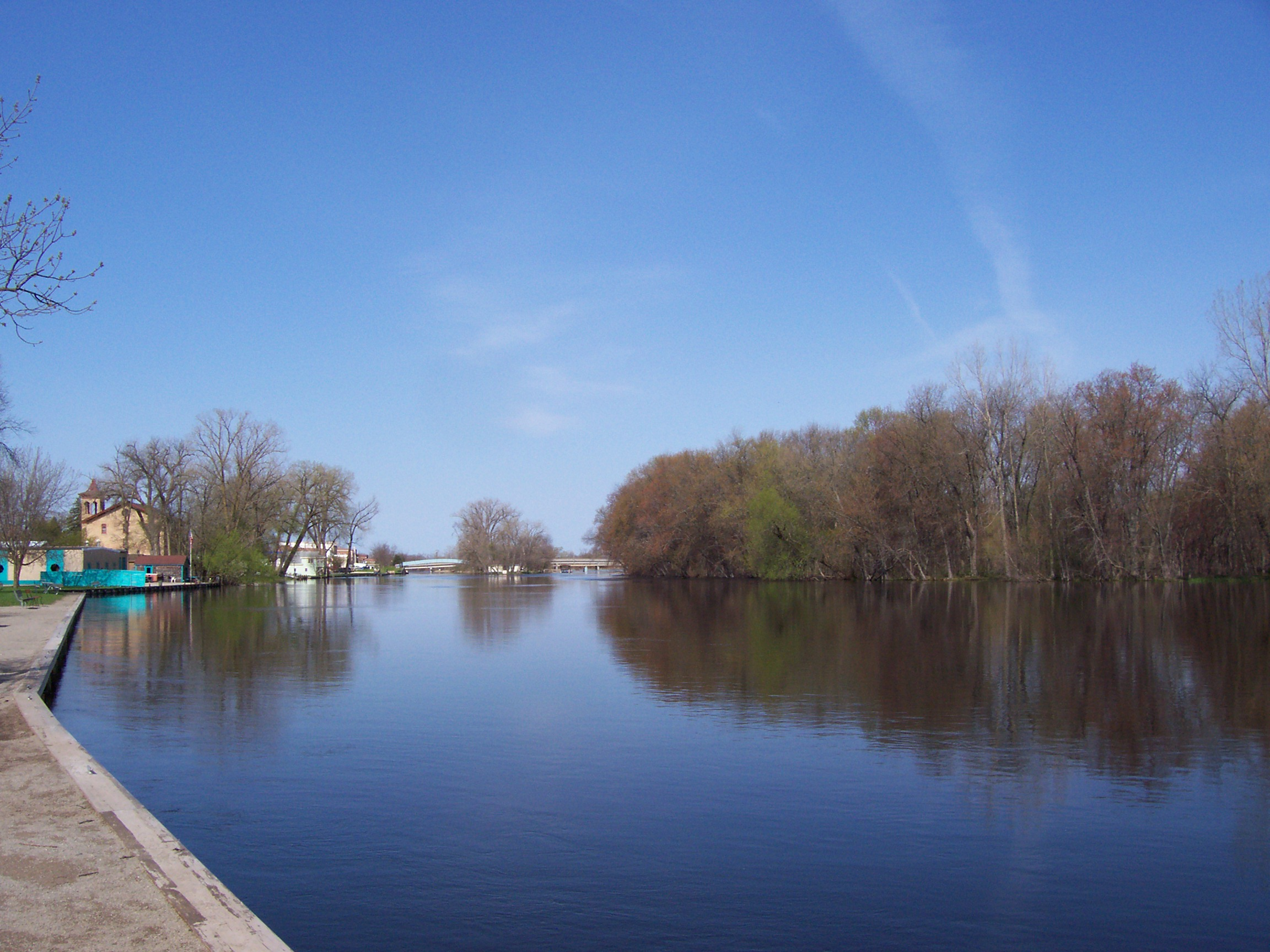
Fox River

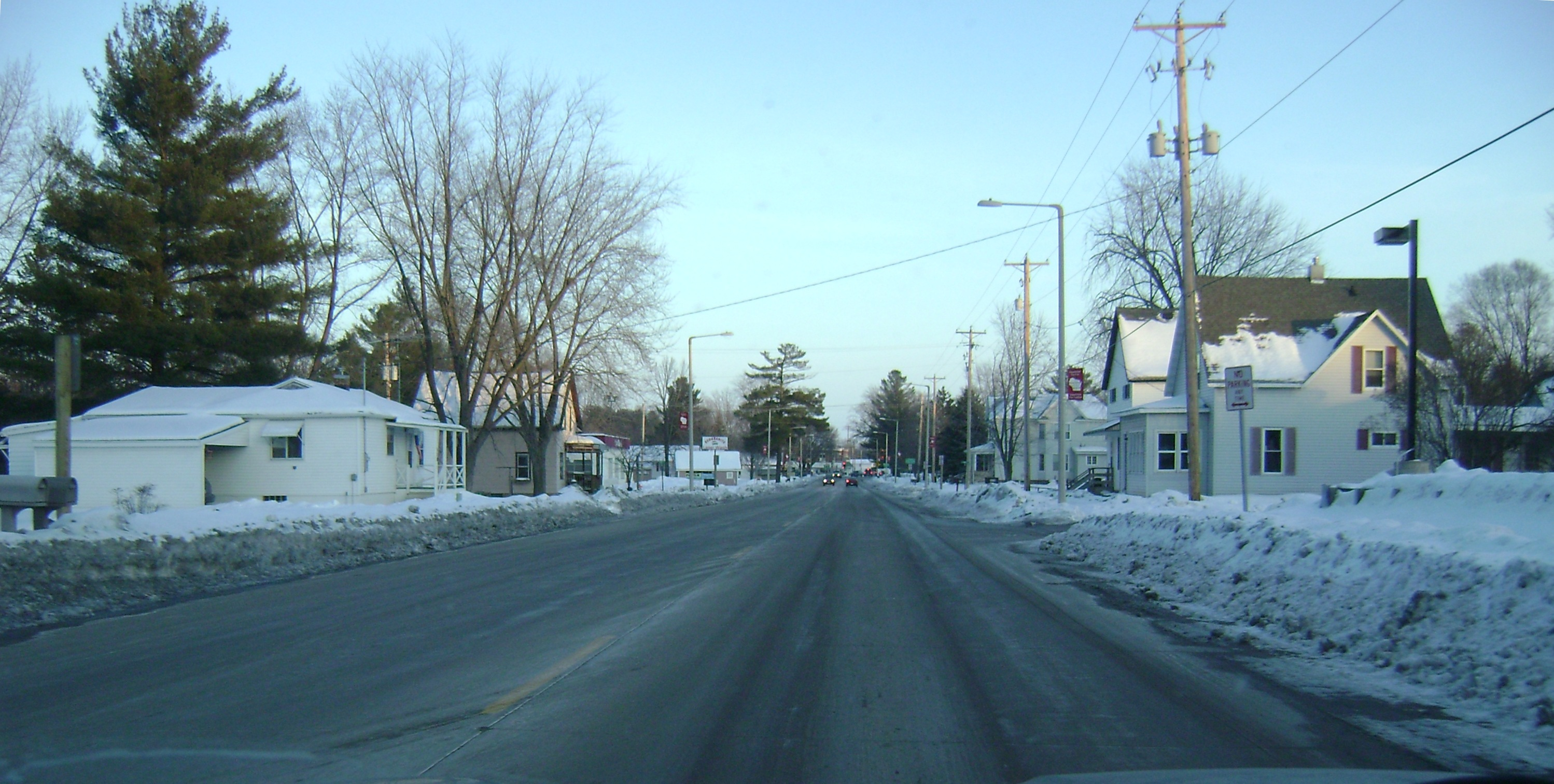
Along Highway 21 in winter

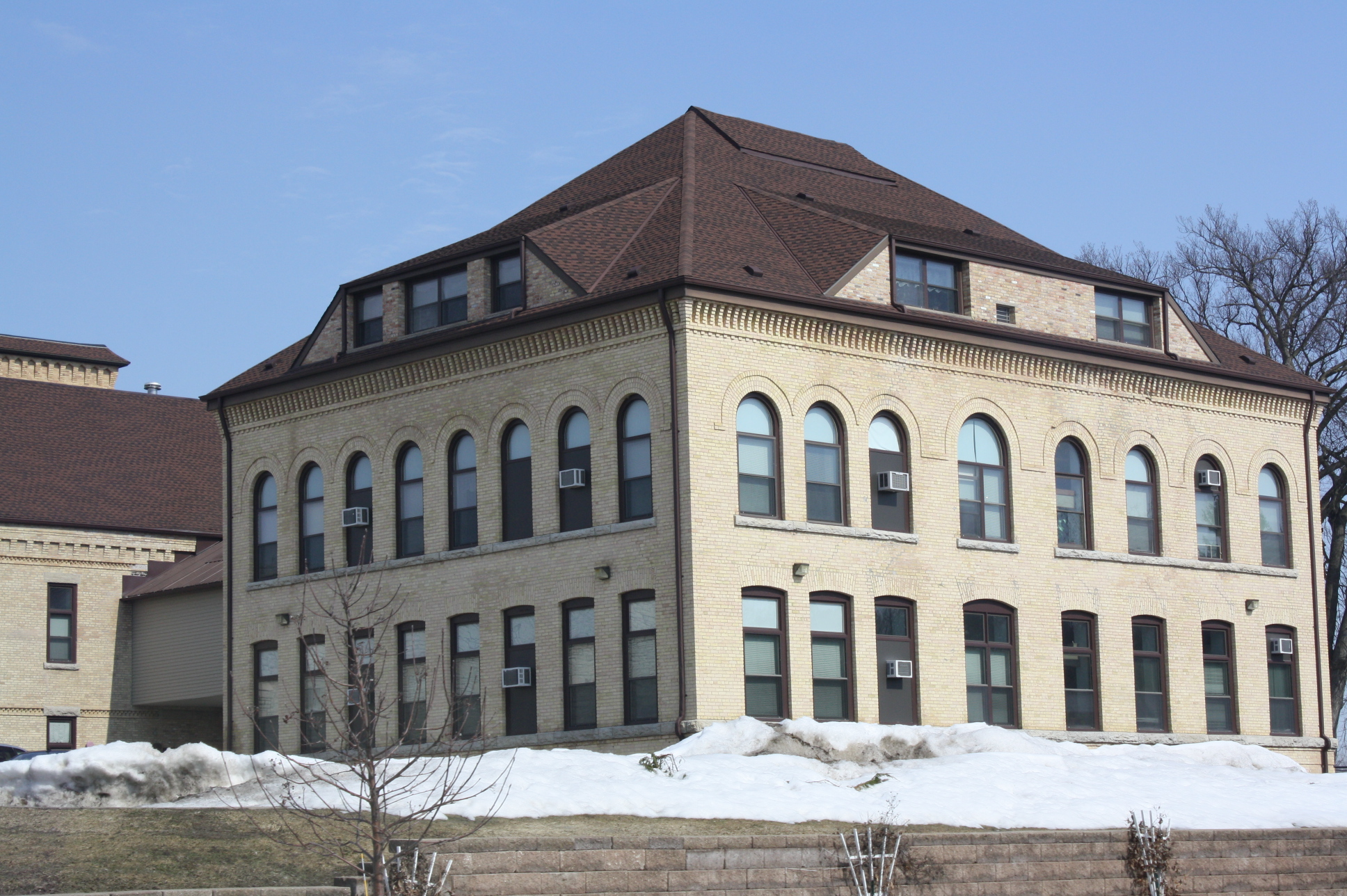
The Omro High School, Annex and Webster Manual Training School in Omro, Wisconsin along Hwy 116. It is listed on the National Register of Historic Places.

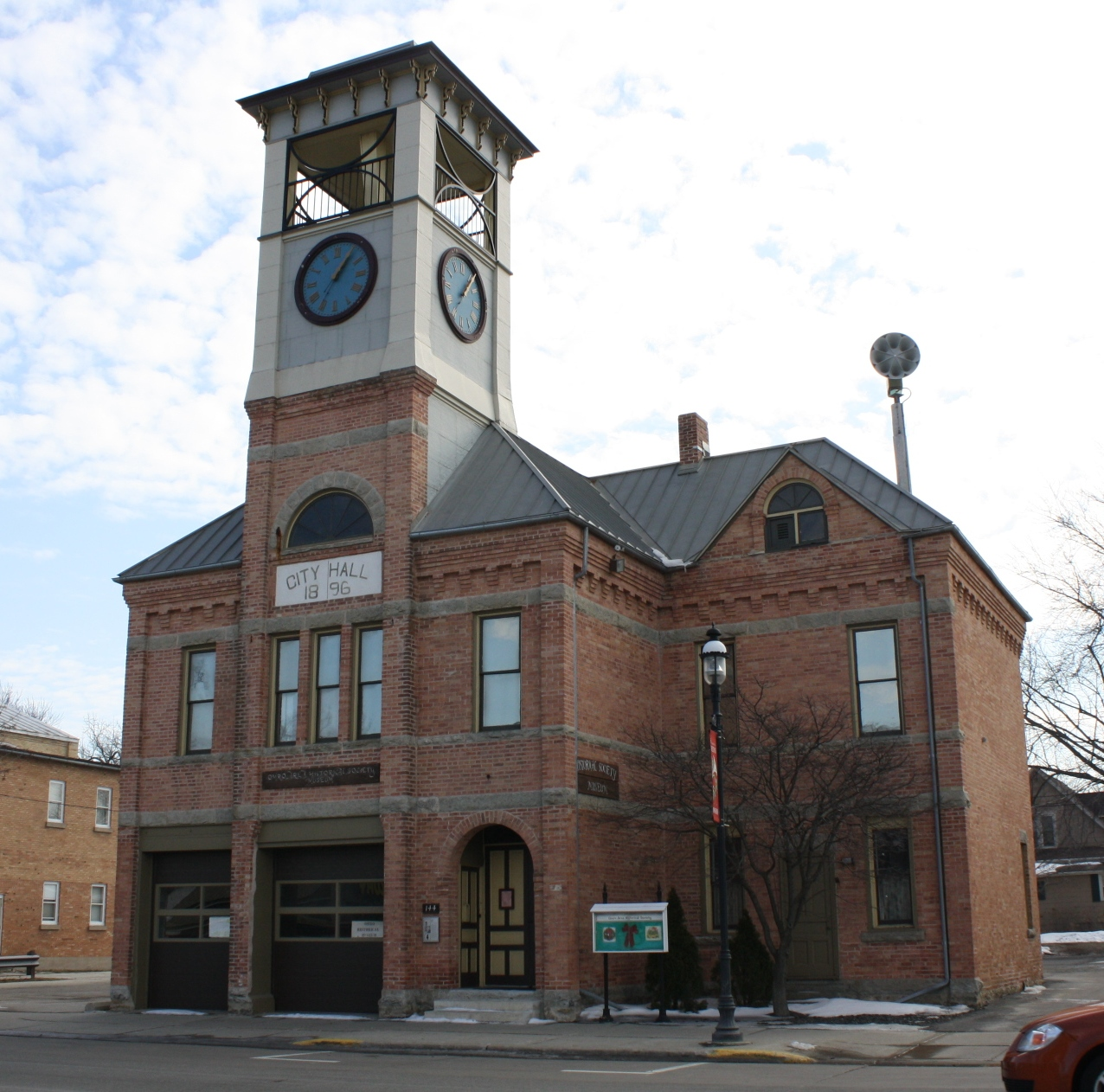
Omro Village Hall and Engine House
