= Merritt L. Campbell =

American politician

Merritt L. Campbell (March 26, 1864 – October 11, 1915) was an American lawyer, businessman, and politician.

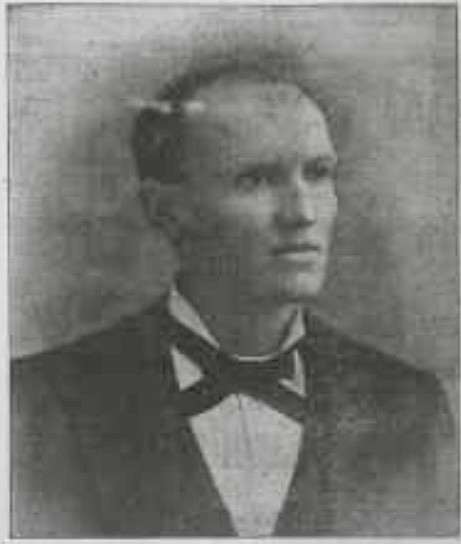
Merritt Campbell

Born in Omro, Winnebago County, Wisconsin, Campbell went to Omro High School. He then went to the University of Wisconsin and Valparaiso University. In 1888, Campbell was admitted to the Wisconsin bar and practiced law in Neenah, Wisconsin. He served as Neenah city attorney and on the Winnebago County Board of Supervisors. In 1901, Campbell was elected mayor of Neenah and was a Democrat. In 1907, Campbell served in the Wisconsin State Assembly. He was involved with an insurance society: the Equitable Fraternal Society. Campbell died at his home in Neenah, Wisconsin.
