= Delbert Philpott =

American soldier and scientist (1923–2005)

Delbert E. Philpott
- Born: September 24, 1923; Omro, Wisconsin
- Died: December 11, 2005 (aged 82)
- Education: Indiana University Bloomington
- Awards: Bronze Star; Purple Heart
- Scientific career
- Fields: Biochemistry
- Workplaces: University of Colorado; NASA; Lockheed Martin

Delbert E. Philpott (September 24, 1923 – December 11, 2005) was an American soldier and scientist.

He was born in Omro, Wisconsin and graduated from Omro High School in 1941. He attended Oshkosh State Teachers College. He served in the Fighting 69th Infantry Division in World War II and was awarded both the Bronze Star and Purple Heart medals.

After the war, Philpott completed his bachelor's degree in Chemistry at Indiana University Bloomington in 1948 and a master's degree in 1949. At the University of Illinois Medical School in Chicago he established the first electron microscope facility, before moving to the Marine Biological Laboratory and Institute for Muscle Research in Woods Hole, Massschusetts in 1952. There, he was Head of Electron Microscopy, directing research projects under Nobel Laureate Albert Szent-Györgyi in the winter and for the Marine Biological Lab during the summer.

Philpott was awarded his PhD in cytology in 1963 from Boston University, and moved to the University of Colorado at Boulder as Professor of Biochemistry. In 1966 he became Head of the Department of Electron Microscopy and Co-Director of the Institute for Biomedical Research at Mercy Hospital in Denver.

He joined NASA as the head of the Ultrastructure Laboratory at the Ames Research Center in Northern California, inspecting lunar soil for any evidence of life. Experiments designed by Philpott were flown on both American and Russian spacecraft, including Apollo 17, Kosmos 736 and Kosmos 936. Philpott retired from NASA in 1990, but continued working under contract with the Lockheed Martin Company at NASA Ames. Philpott authored over 230 scientific papers and wrote articles for several books and magazines in his scientific career.

Philpott was one of ten veterans chosen as guests at the Russian government's 60th anniversary celebration of the end of World War II, seated at the table with Presidents Vladimir Putin and George W. Bush. He and his wife, Donna, also co-edited the book Hands Across The Elbe, comprising stories by American and Russian veterans about the meeting depicted in the Elbe Bridge handshake photograph.
