= Francis L. Garrett =

U.S. Navy officer and chaplain

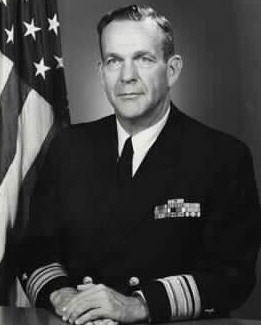
- Born: April 7, 1919; Greenville, South Carolina, US
- Died: May 13, 1992 (aged 73); Falls Church, Virginia, US
- Burial place: Arlington National Cemetery
- Military career
- Allegiance: United States
- Branch: United States Navy
- Rank: rear admiral
- Commands: Chief of Chaplains of the United States Navy

Francis Leonard Garrett (1919–1992) was a Rear Admiral and Chief of Chaplains of the United States Navy.

== Biography ==
Garrett was born on April 7, 1919. He attended Wofford College, Emory University and Union Theological Seminary. Garrett died on May 13, 1992, and is buried at Arlington National Cemetery.

== Career ==
Garrett was commissioned a lieutenant (junior grade) in the United States Navy during World War II and was assigned to Naval Air Station Alameda. Afterwards, he served aboard the USS Rudyerd Bay (CVE-81), the USS Howard W. Gilmore (AS-16) and the USS Hornet (CV-12) and at Naval Air Station Dallas and Naval Station Great Lakes.

From 1965 to 1966, Garrett served in the Vietnam War as Force Chaplain of the III Marine Amphibious Force. During this time, he was awarded the Legion of Merit. In 1969, he became Fleet Chaplain of the United States Atlantic Fleet. The following year, he was named Chief of Chaplains and remained in the position until his retirement in 1975.

Following his retirement from the Navy, Garrett served as Senior Minister at Epworth United Methodist Church in Norfolk, Virginia. He was married to an Associate Reformed Presbyterian (White Oak Patrick).
