= Chief of Chaplains of the United States Navy =

Position in the U.S. Navy

Chief of Navy Chaplains
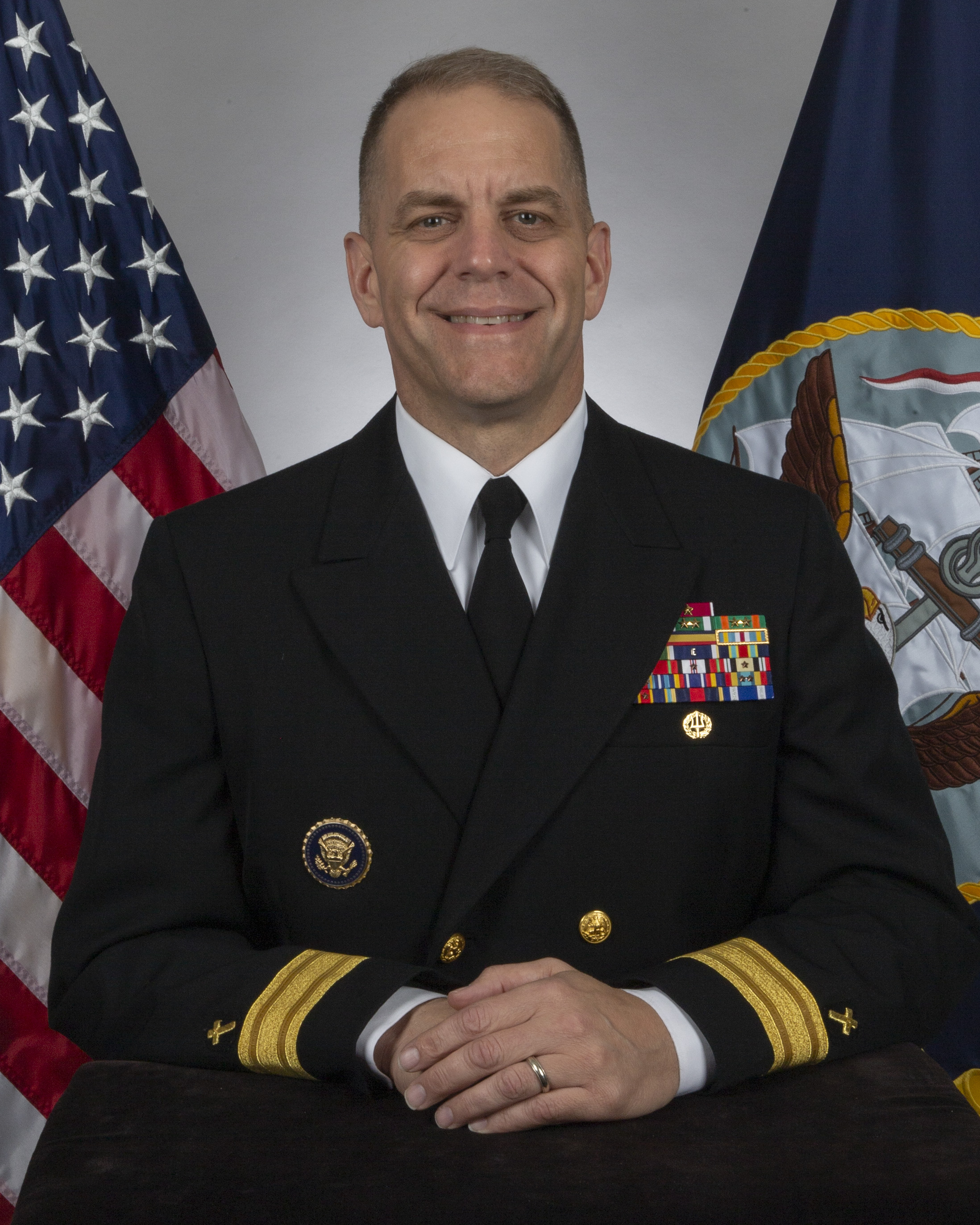
- Incumbent; RADM Carey H. Cash since May 15, 2026
- United States Navy Chaplain Corps; Office of the Chief of Naval Operations
- Type: Military chaplain
- Member of: Armed Forces Chaplains Board
- Reports to: Secretary of the Navy; Chief of Naval Personnel
- Seat: The Pentagon, Arlington, Virginia
- Appointer: The president; with Senate advice and consent
- Term length: 4 years
- Constituting instrument: 10 U.S.C. § 8082
- Formation: November 5, 1917
- First holder: CAPT John B. Frazier
- Deputy: Deputy Chief of Chaplains of the United States Navy/Chaplain of the United States Marine Corps
- Website: Official website

The Chief of the United States Navy Chaplain Corps is the highest-ranking military chaplain in the United States Navy and head of the United States Navy Chaplain Corps. As part of the Office of the Chief of Naval Operations and Department of the Navy, the chief is dual-hatted as the director of religious ministries (N097) under OPNAV. In these capacities, the chief is the principal advisor to the secretary of the Navy, the chief of naval operations and, where appropriate, the commandant of the Marine Corps and commandant of the Coast Guard "on all matters pertaining to religion within the Navy, United States Marine Corps, and United States Coast Guard." For administrative and personnel matters, the chief reports to the chief of naval personnel.

The position was created in 1917 to "provide a system of appointing qualified and professional chaplains that meet the needs of the Navy". The nominee, as decided by the president of the United States, must be an active-duty officer of the Chaplain Corps above the rank of commander who has served in the Corps for at least eight years. The chief serves for a 4-year term, but the president may terminate or extend the appointment at his pleasure. By statute, the officeholder holds the two-star rank of rear admiral while serving as Chief.

The current chief is Rear Admiral Carey H. Cash, a Southern Baptist, who succeeded Lutheran Church-Missouri Synod minister Gregory N. Todd on May 16, 2026.

== List of officeholders ==
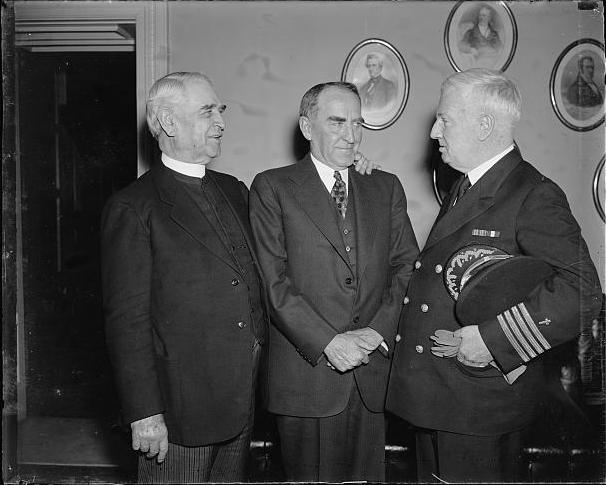
House Chaplain James Shera Montgomery and Speaker William Bankhead welcome Navy Chief of Chaplains Edward A. Duff, the first Navy chaplain in 117 years (since 1820) to open a House session as guest chaplain, March 25, 1937

	Name	Photo	Term began	Term ended
1.	CAPT John B. Frazier		November 5, 1917	November 1921
2.	CAPT Evan W. Scott		November 1921	July 1926
3.	CAPT Curtis H. Dickins		July 1926	July 1929
4.	CAPT Sidney K. Evans		July 1929	July 1935
5.	CAPT Edward A. Duff		July 1935	July 1937
6.	CAPT Robert D. Workman		July 1937	July 1945
7.	RADM William N. Thomas		July 1945	September 1949
8.	RADM Stanton W. Salisbury		September 1949	February 1953
9.	RADM Edward B. Harp, Jr.		February 1953	June 1958
10.	RADM George A. Rosso		June 1958	July 1963
11.	RADM J. Floyd Dreith		July 1963	July 1965
12.	RADM James W. Kelly		July 1965	July 1970
13.	RADM Francis L. Garrett		July 1970	July 1975
14.	RADM John J. O'Connor		July 1975	May 1979
15.	RADM Ross H. Trower		May 1979	August 1983
16.	RADM Neil M. Stevenson		August 1983	August 1985
17.	RADM John R. McNamara		August 1985	June 1988
18.	RADM Alvin B. Koeneman		June 1988	August 1991
19.	RADM David E. White		August 1991	August 1994
20.	RADM Donald K. Muchow		August 1994	August 1997
21.	RADM A. Byron Holderby, Jr.		August 1997	August 2000
22.	RADM Barry Black		August 2000	August 15, 2003
23.	RADM Louis V. Iasiello		August 16, 2003	June 22, 2006
24.	RADM Robert F. Burt		June 23, 2006	August 26, 2010
25.	RADM Mark L. Tidd		August 27, 2010	August 1, 2014
26.	RADM Margaret G. Kibben		August 2, 2014	July 22, 2018
27.	RADM Brent W. Scott		July 23, 2018	May 16, 2022
28.	RADM Gregory N. Todd		May 16, 2022	May 16, 2026
29.	RADM Carey H. Cash		May 15, 2026	Incumbent

== Memorial hallway ==
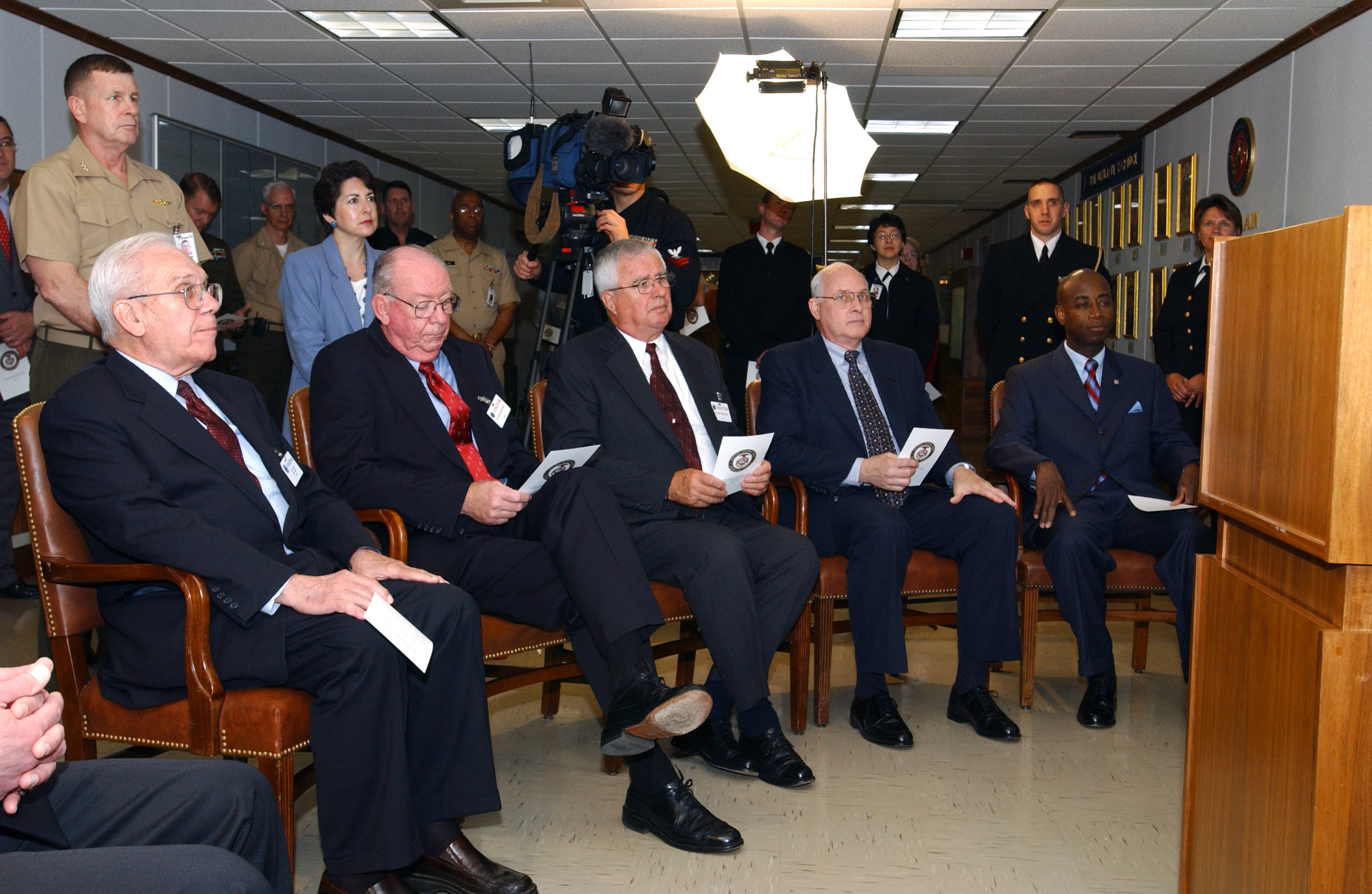
Chaplains Trower, Stevenson, Koeneman, White, and Black at the dedication of the Chief of Chaplains Hallway

A hallway to honor former chiefs of Navy Chaplain Corps was dedicated at the Navy Annex, in Arlington, Va., in 2004. Five former chiefs of chaplains were present at the dedication ceremony, including Barry Black, Alvin B. Koeneman, Neil M. Stevenson, Ross H. Trower, and David F. White.

== See also ==
- Armed Forces Chaplains Board
- Deputy Chief of Chaplains of the United States Navy
  - Chaplain of the United States Marine Corps
- Chaplain of the Coast Guard
- Chiefs of Chaplains of the United States
- International Military Chiefs of Chaplains Conference
