= Evan W. Scott =

Evan Walter Scott
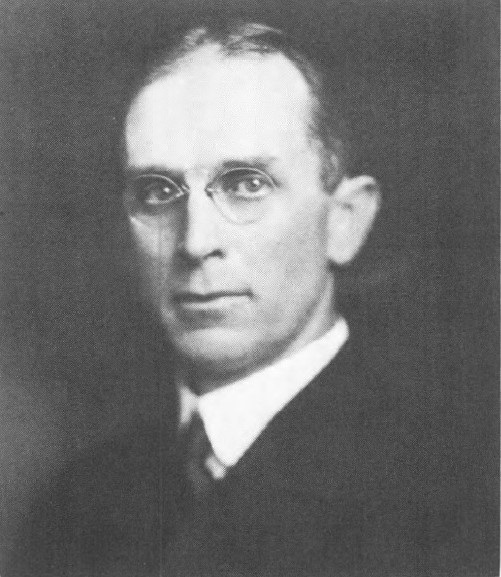
- Evan Walter Scott; 2nd Chief of Chaplains of the United States Navy
- Born: December 12, 1876; Lebanon, Ohio, U.S.
- Died: September 22, 1955 (aged 78); San Diego, California, U.S.
- Burial place: Arlington National Cemetery; Arlington, Virginia
- Military career
- Allegiance: United States
- Branch: United States Navy
- Service years: 1904–1940
- Rank: Captain
- Conflicts: World War I

Captain Evan Walter Scott, USN (December 12, 1876 – September 22, 1955) was an American Navy officer who served as the 2nd Chief of Chaplains of the United States Navy from 1921 to 1926.

Military offices
Preceded by John B. Frazier	Chief of Chaplains of the United States Navy; 1921–1926	Succeeded by Curtis H. Dickins
