= Alva J. Brasted =

American Army officer (1876–1965)

Alva Jennings Brasted
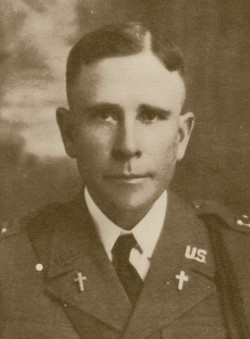
- Colonel Alva Jennings Brasted; 4th Chief of Chaplains of the United States Army
- Born: July 5, 1876; Findley Lake, New York
- Died: May 27, 1965 (aged 88); Washington, D.C.
- Burial place: Arlington National Cemetery; Arlington, Virginia
- Military career
- Allegiance: United States
- Branch: United States Army
- Service years: 1913–1937
- Rank: Colonel
- Commands: U.S. Army Chaplain Corps
- Conflicts: World War I

Chaplain (Colonel) Alva Jennings Brasted (July 5, 1876 – May 27, 1965) was an American Army officer who served as the 4th Chief of Chaplains of the United States Army from 1933 to 1937.

He graduated from Des Moines College in 1902 and University of Chicago and Theological School in 1905.

== Personal life ==
In May 1936, Chaplain Brasted was elected as Chaplain General of the National Society of the Sons of the American Revolution at the National SAR’s 46th Annual Congress held in Portland, Maine.

Military offices
Preceded by Julian E. Yates	Chief of Chaplains of the United States Army; 1933–1937	Succeeded by William R. Arnold
