= Neil M. Stevenson =

US Navy chaplain (1930–2009)

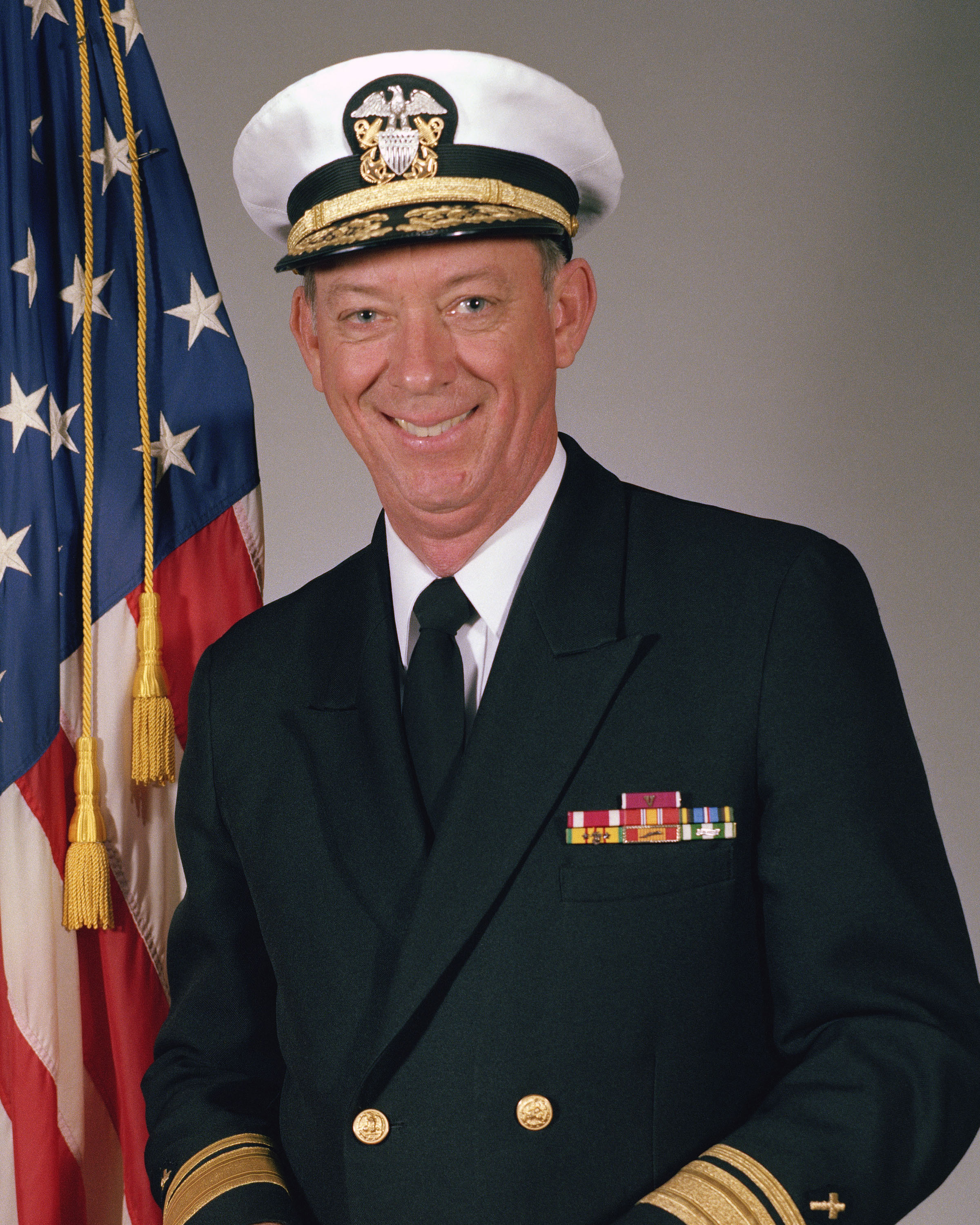
- Born: December 26, 1930; Brooklyn, New York, U.S.
- Died: November 21, 2009 (aged 78); Williamsburg, Virginia, U.S.
- Military career
- Allegiance: United States of America
- Branch: United States Navy
- Service years: 1956–1985
- Rank: Rear admiral
- Commands: Chief of Chaplains of the United States Navy

Neil MacGill Stevenson (December 26, 1930 – November 21, 2009) was a rear admiral and Chief of Chaplains of the United States Navy.

== Biography ==
Stevenson was born in Brooklyn in 1930. He attended the Bay Ridge United Presbyterian Church (now the Bay Ridge United Church). He graduated from Fort Hamilton High School in 1948, Tarkio College (B.A., 1952) and Pittsburgh Theological Seminary (M.Div., 1955) before attending Princeton Theological Seminary (M.Th., 1968).

Stevenson died on November 21, 2009, in Williamsburg, Virginia. He is buried in Arlington National Cemetery on February 26, 2010.

== Career ==
Stevenson was commissioned in the United States Naval Reserve on June 30, 1956, and reported to the Chaplain School in Newport, Rhode Island for training in April 1957. He was later stationed at Naval Station Great Lakes, Naval Station Newport and Naval Air Station Glenview, as well as aboard the USS Saratoga (CV-60).

After serving in the Vietnam War, Stevenson was named Senior Chaplain at Naval Training Center Orlando. He later served as Fleet Chaplain of the United States Pacific Fleet Deputy Chief of Chaplains. Stevenson was Chief of Chaplains from 1983 until his retirement in 1985.

After his retirement from the Navy, he was pastor of Williamsburg Presbyterian Church in southern Virginia for 10 years, helped launch the Stone House Presbyterian Church in Toano, Va., and was interim pastor at Yorkminster Presbyterian Church.
