= Alvin B. Koeneman =

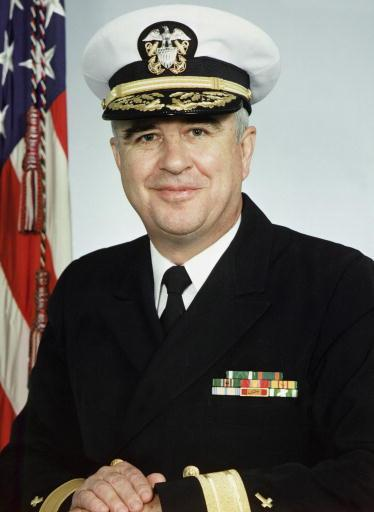
- Born: July 1, 1933; Omro, Wisconsin, U.S.
- Died: February 20, 2018 (aged 84); Tucson, Arizona
- Military career
- Allegiance: United States of America
- Branch: United States Navy
- Rank: Rear admiral
- Commands: Chief of Chaplains of the United States Navy
- Awards: Defense Distinguished Service Medal; Navy Distinguished Service Medal; Legion of Merit; Defense Superior Service Medal

Alvin Berthold Koeneman (July 1, 1933 – February 21, 2018) was a rear admiral in the United States Navy. He was Chief of Chaplains of the United States Navy from June 1988 to August 1991.

== Early life and education ==
Koeneman was born in Omro, Wisconsin, in 1933. He earned a B.A. from Wartburg College in 1955 and a B.Div. from the Wartburg Theological Seminary in 1959. Koeneman married Emelie Ruth Jackson on June 3, 1956. He was ordained an Evangelical Lutheran priest on June 6, 1959, in Oshkosh, Wisconsin. Koeneman served as a pastor in Santee, California, from 1959 to 1962 and then as an assistant pastor in Santa Ana, California, from 1962 to 1967.

== Military career ==
Koeneman was commissioned in the United States Naval Reserve on September 2, 1962. He reported for training at the chaplain school in Newport, Rhode Island, in April 1967. Koeneman was assigned to Yokosuka, Japan from July 1967 to December 1968, but also ministered in the Mekong Delta of Vietnam. He later served aboard USS Carl Vinson from October 1980 to April 1983. Koeneman was promoted to captain on July 1, 1981 and then promoted to flag rank in 1985. He received an honorary D.Div. degree from the Wartburg Theological Seminary in May 1987. Koeneman was also conferred an honorary LL.D. degree by Wartburg College in 1988. He received the Defense Distinguished Service Medal, Navy Distinguished Service Medal, Legion of Merit and Defense Superior Service Medal.

== Later life ==
After retiring from the Navy, Koeneman returned to Wartburg College as an administrator. After his wife Emelie died in 2001, he married Carol Wessels Bye on August 1, 2003. Koeneman later served as an interim pastor in Cedar Falls, Iowa, before moving to Arizona. He died on February 20, 2018, in Tucson. Koeneman and his first wife Emelie Ruth (Jackson) Koeneman (July 27, 1935 – November 9, 2001) are buried in Arlington National Cemetery.
