= John B. Frazier =

John Brown Frazier
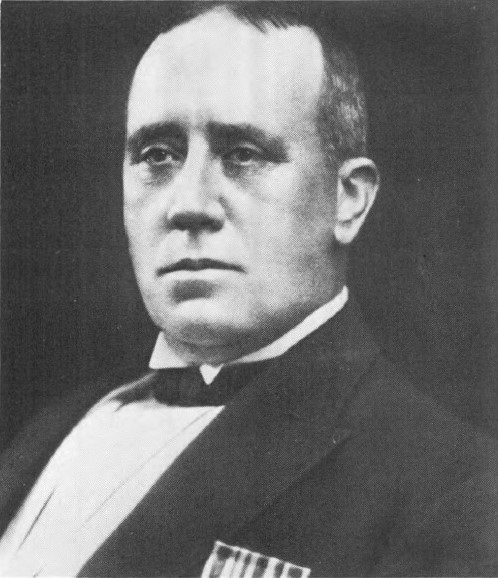
- Born: December 19, 1870; Wytheville, Virginia, U.S.
- Died: November 11, 1939 (aged 68); Keswick, Virginia, U.S.
- Burial place: Arlington National Cemetery; Arlington, Virginia
- Military career
- Allegiance: United States
- Branch: United States Navy
- Service years: 1895–1925
- Rank: Captain
- Conflicts: Spanish–American War; World War I

John Brown Frazier (December 19, 1870 – November 11, 1939) was a United States Navy officer who served as the 1st Chief of Chaplains of the United States Navy from 1917 to 1921. In this capacity, together with Julian E. Yates of the United States Army, he edited The Army and Navy Hymnal (1920).

Frazier was born in Wytheville, Virginia in 1870. Trained as a Southern Methodist minister, he joined the Navy on March 2, 1895 in Tennessee and was commissioned in the Chaplain Corps on May 25, 1895. Frazier was assigned as chaplain to the crew of the USS Olympia on July 19, 1895. He continued to serve aboard the Olympia for three years, including the May 1, 1898 Battle of Manila Bay where she served as Commodore George Dewey's flagship. Frazier was reassigned to the training ship USS Adams on November 12, 1898.

Frazier was promoted to captain on June 30, 1914. As Chief of Chaplains, he supervised an increase in active-duty chaplains from 40 to 203 during World War I. After serving as Chief of Chaplains, he was assigned as chaplain for the naval training station at Hampton Roads, Virginia on December 1, 1921. Frazier retired from the Navy on September 10, 1925.

Frazier died at his home in Keswick, Virginia in 1939. He was buried in Arlington National Cemetery along with his wife Catherine Bowles Cook Frazier (February 27, 1878 – November 11, 1933).

Military offices
Preceded by None	Chief of Chaplains of the United States Navy; 1917–1921	Succeeded by Evan W. Scott
