= David E. White =

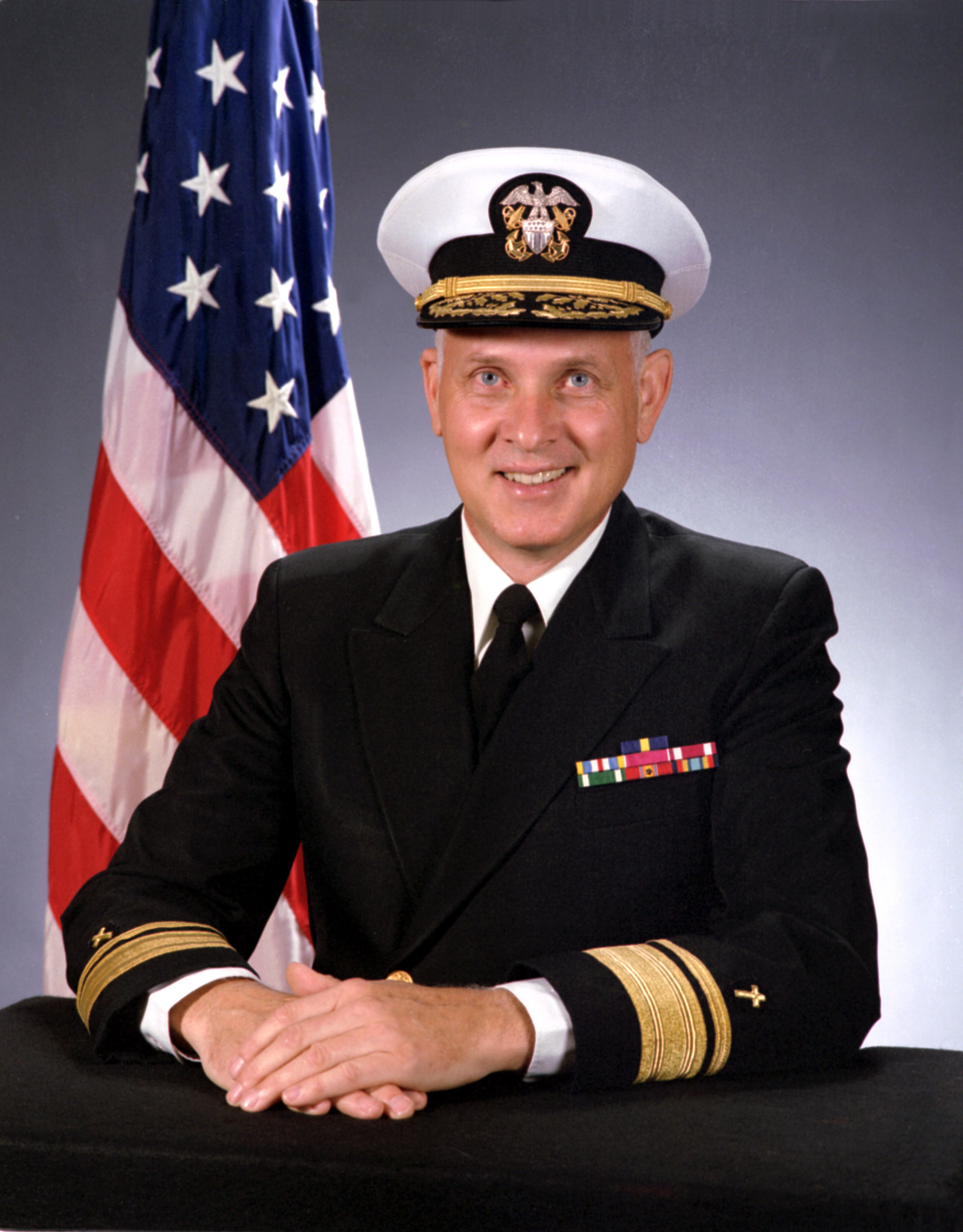
- Born: November 26, 1938 (age 87); Amsterdam, New York, U.S.
- Military career
- Allegiance: United States
- Branch: United States Navy
- Rank: Rear admiral
- Commands: Chief of Chaplains of the United States Navy

David Edward White (born November 26, 1938) is a retired rear admiral in the United States Navy. He was Chief of Chaplains of the United States Navy from August 1991 to August 1994. He earned an A.B. degree from Hope College in 1960 and an M.Div. degree from the New Brunswick Theological Seminary in 1963. White was commissioned as an ensign on March 5, 1962, and promoted to lieutenant (junior grade) after completing his training as a Reformed Church in America minister. He later received an M.S. degree from the Naval Postgraduate School in 1973.
