= Julian E. Yates =

American Army officer

Julian Emmett Yates
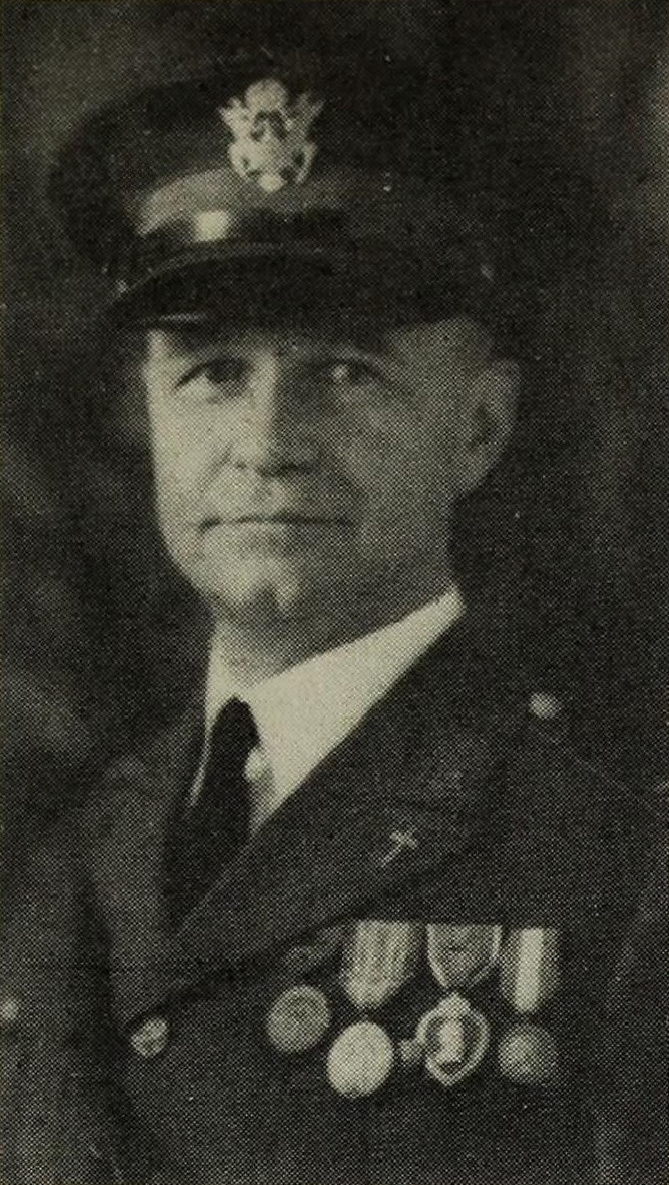
- Colonel Julian Emmett Yates; 3rd Chief of Chaplains of the United States Army
- Born: October 23, 1871; Williams Mills, North Carolina
- Died: May 24, 1953 (aged 81); Nantucket, Massachusetts
- Burial place: Arlington National Cemetery; Arlington, Virginia
- Military career
- Allegiance: United States
- Branch: United States Army
- Service years: 1902–1935
- Rank: Colonel
- Commands: U.S. Army Chaplain Corps
- Conflicts: World War I

Chaplain (Colonel) Julian Emmett Yates (October 23, 1871 – May 24, 1953) was an American Army officer who served as the 3rd Chief of Chaplains of the United States Army from 1929 to 1933. Together with John B. Frazier, the Chief of Chaplains of the United States Navy, he edited The Army and Navy Hymnal (1920).

Military offices
Preceded by Edmund P. Easterbrook	Chief of Chaplains of the United States Army; 1929–1933	Succeeded by Alva J. Brasted
