= A. Byron Holderby Jr. =

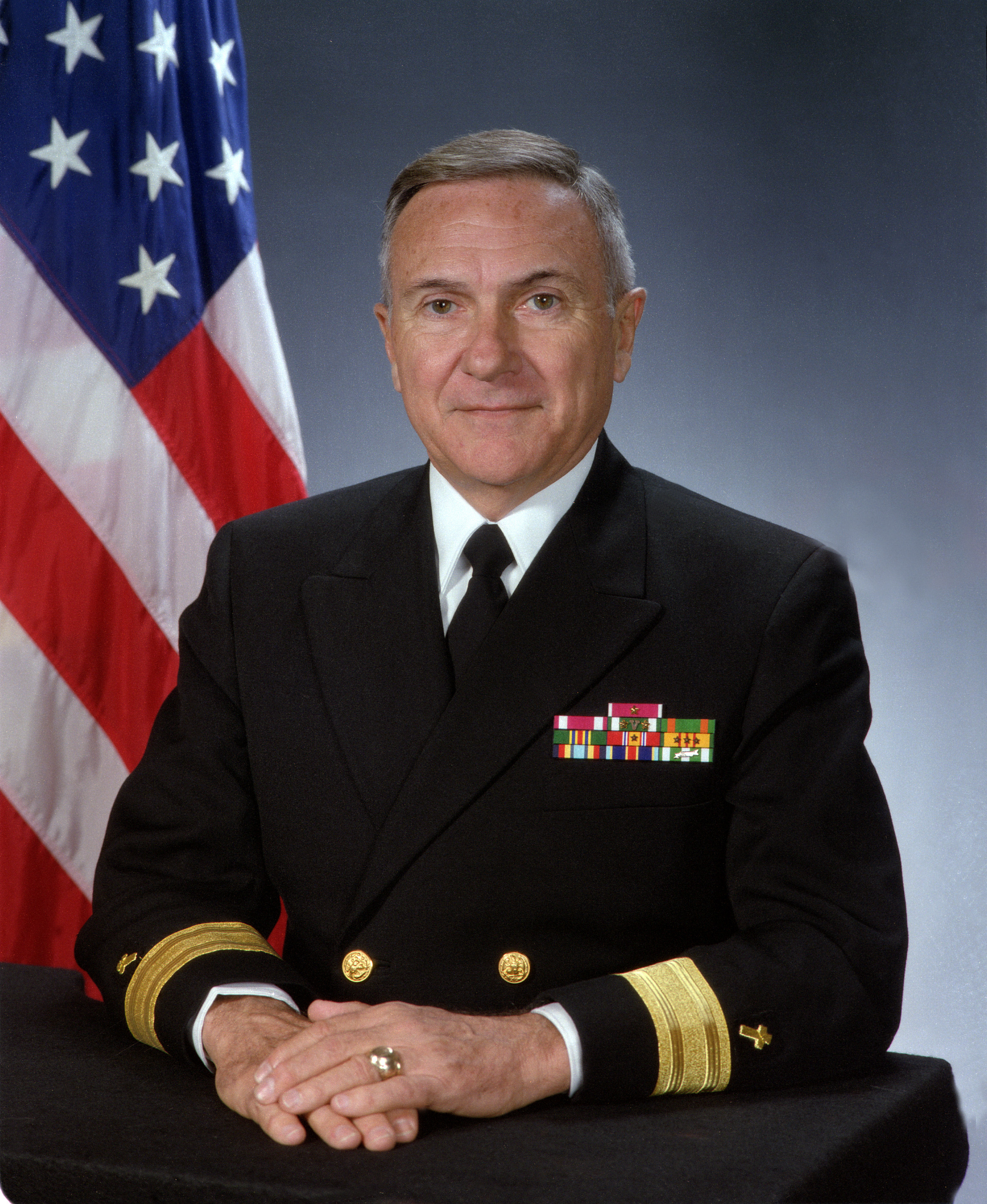
- Born: April 13, 1935; Norfolk, Virginia, U.S.
- Died: August 24, 2012 (aged 77); Pinehurst, North Carolina, U.S.
- Military career
- Allegiance: United States of America
- Branch: United States Navy
- Rank: Rear admiral
- Commands: Chief of Chaplains of the United States Navy

Anderson Byron Holderby Jr. (April 13, 1935 – August 24, 2012) was a rear admiral and Chief of Chaplains of the United States Navy.

== Biography ==
Holderby was born in Norfolk, Virginia. He graduated from the College of William & Mary (A.B., 1957) and the Lutheran Theological Southern Seminary (B.Div., 1963) and became a pastor in Roanoke, Virginia. Holderby later completed a Master of Arts in Counseling (M.A.C.) degree at the University of North Florida in 1976.

Holderby died on August 24, 2012, in Pinehurst, North Carolina, and is buried at Arlington National Cemetery.

== Military career ==
Holderby joined the United States Navy in 1967. Later, he was deployed to serve in the Vietnam War. Afterwards, he was stationed at Marine Corps Base Camp Lejeune with the 2nd Marine Division.

After an assignment at Guantanamo Bay Naval Base, Holderby was stationed at Naval Air Station Cecil Field. Later, he served as Senior Chaplain aboard the USS America (CV-66).

From 1985 to 1989, Holderby served as Senior Chaplain of the United States Naval Academy. Afterwards, he joined the Chief of Chaplains Office, where he was tasked with detailing chaplains with their assignments. Later, he became Chaplain of the United States Pacific Fleet. After three years of serving as Deputy Chief of Chaplains, Holderby became Chief of Chaplains in 1997. He remained in the position until his retirement in 2000.
