= Jonathan White (admiral) =

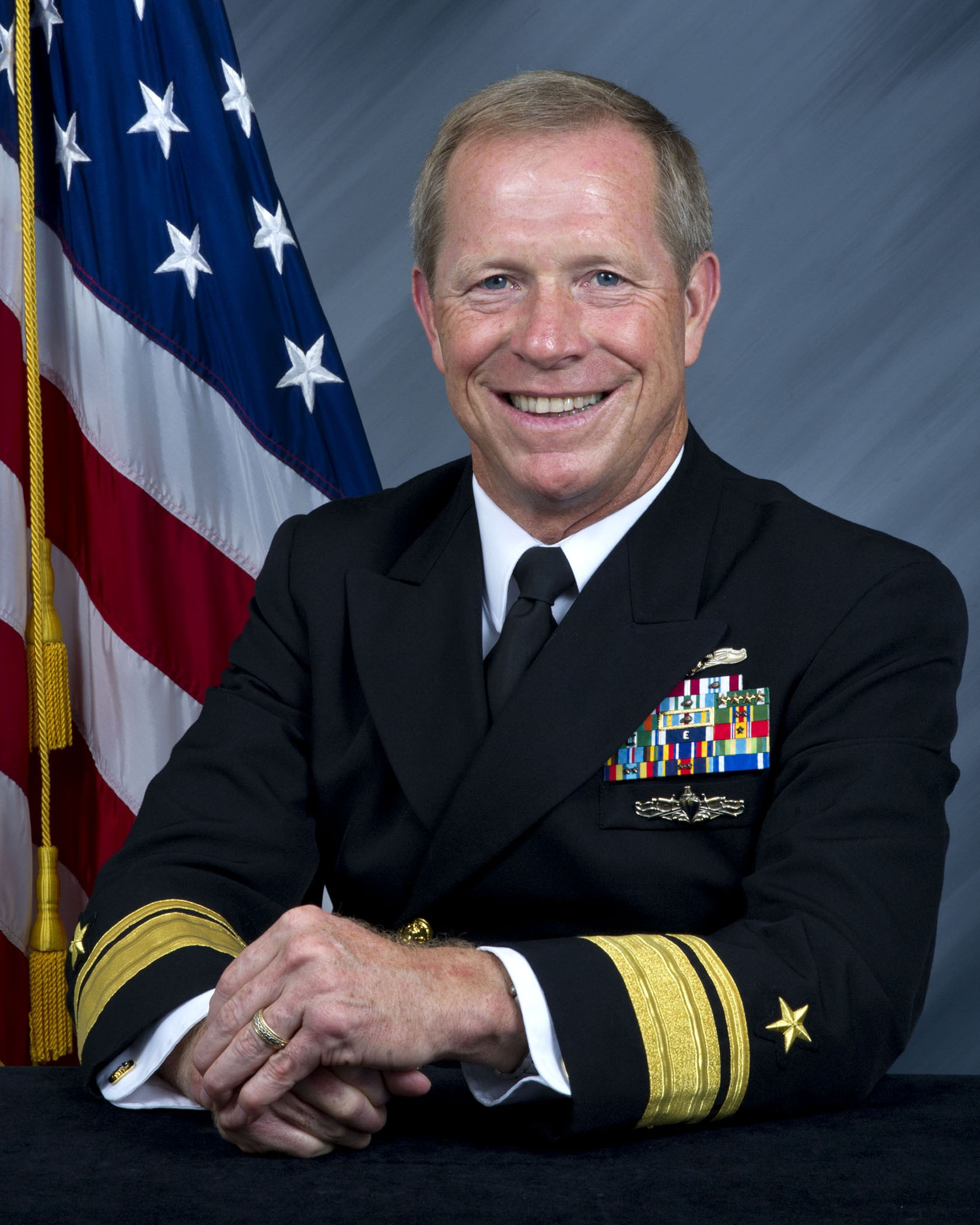
Jonathan White in 2012

Jonathan Wickliffe White (born c. 1957 in Panama City, Florida) is a retired United States Navy admiral and oceanography leader.

== Early life ==
White was born in Panama City, Florida. His father was a World War II Army Air Corps veteran and Purple Heart recipient; his mother supported the war through her work in Oak Ridge, Tennessee. His passion for the ocean began at age seven, thanks to the influence of a Navy diver who lived next door.

White received a Bachelor of Science degree in Oceanographic Technology from Florida Institute of Technology in 1981. He received a Master of Arts degree from the US Naval Postgraduate School in 1983.

== U.S. Navy career ==
After working at sea as a civilian oceanographer on board a seismic survey vessel, he was commissioned through Navy Officer Candidate School in 1983, and assigned as a surface warfare officer to USS John L. Hall (FFG 32) in Mayport, Florida. During his Navy career White served as Destroyer Group commander, then as superintendent of the US Naval Observatory. He was a commander in the Naval Meteorology and Oceanography Command. In 2012 he was elevated to Rear Admiral rank, and was designated as the Oceanographer and Navigator of the US Navy, and Director of the Navy Task Force assigned to address climate change.

Due to global warming, the Arctic ice is melting and dispersing faster than previously anticipated. In response, the US Navy is examining an increased presence in polar areas. In 2012, White was designated to direct this research. His group are considering increased satellite coverage in high-latitude areas, modifying existing ship designs to safely operate in polar conditions, and budgetary projections to cover such operations.

White retired from active duty in the U.S. Navy on 31 October 2015.

== Post-navy career ==
White was appointed as president and CEO of Consortium for Ocean Leadership (COL) in January 2016. In this role he supervises and controls all of the business and affairs of the organization. COL is a Washington, D.C. nonprofit organization that represents the leading public and private ocean research education institutions, aquaria, and industry with the mission to shape the future of ocean science and technology. In addition to its advocacy role as the voice of the ocean research and technology community, COL manages a variety of community-wide research and education programs in areas of ocean observing, ocean exploration, and ocean partnerships.

White is a member of the Center for Climate and Security's Advisory Board.
