= Goodridge (surname) =

Goodridge is a surname, and may refer to:

- Alan Goodridge (1871–1927), Newfoundland politician
- Amari Goodridge (born 2001), Barbadian cricketer
- Augustus F. Goodridge (1839–1920), Newfoundland merchant and politician
- Bob Goodridge (born 1946), American football player
- Elizabeth Goodridge (1798–1882), American miniaturist
- David Goodridge, English chef
- Emily Goodridge Grey (1834–1916), American abolitionist
- Francie Kraker Goodridge (born 1947), American track and field athlete
- Gary Goodridge (born 1966), Trinidadian martial arts fighter
- Glenalvin Goodridge (1829–1867), American photographer
- Gregory Goodridge (born 1971), Barbadian professional football player
- Harry Goodridge (1916–1990), American harbormaster and professional scuba diver
- Henry Goodridge (1797–1864), English architect
- Henry Goodridge (politician) (1849–1914), Canadian politician
- James Goodridge (1852–1900), Canadian politician
- Jennifer Goodridge (born 1980), American musician
- Jon Goodridge (born 1981), professional rugby union player
- Karina Goodridge, Barbadian politician
- Laila Goodridge (born 1986), Canadian politician
- Lawrence Goodridge, Canadian food scientist
- Mace Goodridge (born 1999), English professional footballer
- May Kennedy Goodridge (1876–1974), Canadian suffragist in Newfoundland
- Mike Goodridge (film producer), British media executive and journalist
- Reginald Goodridge (born 1952), Liberian politician
- Robin Goodridge (born 1965), British drummer
- Sarah Goodridge (1788–1853), American painter
- Sehon Goodridge (1937–2007), Barbadian Anglican Bishop and author
- Stanley Goodridge (1928–2016), Jamaican cricketer
- Theodore Goodridge Roberts (1877–1953), Canadian novelist and poet
- Vernon Goodridge (born 1984), American professional basketball player
- William C. Goodridge (1806-1873), American businessman and Underground Railroad stationmaster
- William M. Goodridge (1777–1833), American organ builder who changed his family name to "Goodrich"
