= William C. Goodridge =

American businessman and abolitionist (1806–1873)

- Born: 1806; Baltimore, Maryland, U.S.
- Died: January 1, 1873 (aged 66–67); Minneapolis, Minnesota, U.S.
- Resting place: Minneapolis Pioneers and Soldiers Memorial Cemetery
- Other name: William C. Goodrich
- Occupations: Barber, merchant
- Known for: Underground Railroad activism
- Spouse: Evalina Wallace
- Children: 7, including Glenalvin

William C. Goodridge (1806 – January 1, 1873) was an American businessman in York, Pennsylvania, in the mid-1800s. He was multiracial and a Black abolitionist and a conductor on the Underground Railroad. Born enslaved, Goodridge and his wife, Evalina Wallace Goodridge, started with a barbershop in 1827 and built a significant estate through diverse investments and enterprises, all of which they put at risk as stationmasters in the Underground Railroad.

Among those whose freedom Goodridge helped secure and retain, were the farmers and one fugitive slave involved in the Christiana Resistance of 1851, where black and white abolitionists killed a Southern slaveholder who was pursuing his property in Christiana, Pennsylvania, according to rights granted to him by the Fugitive Slave Act of 1850. Goodridge also conducted Osborne Perry Anderson, first lieutenant of John Brown, in his escape to Canada following the failed 1859 raid on Harpers Ferry. Both the Christiana Resistance and the raid on Harpers Ferry were significant events leading up to the Civil War.

== Biography ==
William C. Goodridge was born in 1806 in Baltimore, Maryland. The son of a Black American woman and a white man, Goodridge was a slave at birth. His grandmother was owned by Charles Carroll of Carrollton, a delegate to the Continental Congress in York, and a signer of the Declaration of Independence. The Carroll family sold Goodridge's mother to a physician in Baltimore the year before William was born. It is not known for certain who his father was, but it is possible that the middle initial C. stands for Carroll or Carrollton. The Goodridge surname, also spelled Goodrich early on, might have been invented to give the impression of wealth.

At the age of 6, Goodridge was indentured to the tanner Reverend Dunn in York, Pennsylvania. As a condition of the indenture, Dunn educated and trained the boy. In 1822 the Tannery failed, and Dunn freed Goodridge, then 16. Goodridge found training as a barber, and was later able to buy out his boss at a barbershop in York.

In 1827, Goodridge married Evalina Wallace of Baltimore. They had seven children, five of whom – Glenalvin J., Emily O., Wallace L., Mary, and William O. – lived to full adulthood. The other two may have shared a heart condition with their mother, which took Albertus when he was 10 and Susan at 20. Evalina Goodridge, also known as Emily, died in December 1852. In her obituary it was noted that she was an equal partner in her husband's businesses.

Goodridge departed York sometime in 1865. He died in Minneapolis, Minnesota, on January 1, 1873, and is buried at the Minneapolis Pioneers and Soldiers Memorial Cemetery.

== Entrepreneurship and financial success ==
The Goodridges purchased property at 125 East Philadelphia Street (since renumbered to 123) in 1827. In addition to the house, their property contained a stable and a summer kitchen. There was a cherry orchard across the street.

The Goodridge barbershop, located in York's Centre Square, expanded to carry candy, cosmetics, jewelry, and toys, and became popular with the children of York. They opened a variety store next door, and also experimented with a Bath House. Goodridge manufactured "Oil of Celsus", his own treatment for baldness, which he marketed to barbers in more than a dozen cities, including Philadelphia. Advertising for "Oil of Census" displayed the endorsement of many of the prominent white businessmen of York, demonstrating Goodridge's acceptance by a rich white clientele. Promotion of it also led to the production of the first glass bottle to have "York, PA" imprinted on it, along with the name Goodridge.

In 1840 Goodridge briefly expanded to an additional barbershop in Philadelphia. That only lasted a year, but may have established important business contacts. In 1838 the railroad had come to York from Baltimore and in 1842 Goodridge opened a freight delivery service, the "Reliance Line of Burthen Cars", which served 22 towns along the railroad line between York and Philadelphia.

As their businesses thrived, Goodridge and his wife invested in commercial and residential real estate, including a former Lancastrian School building, which they donated to the African-American school. Having already developed a business center on the Centre square of York, in 1847 they sold that and built an even bigger one. Centre Hall was a five-story commercial property that rented space to a tavern, a band, and York's first newspaper, The Democrat. Their barbershop and store also moved to Centre Hall, they briefly ran an employment office there, and they rented out rooms on the third floor. It was the first 5-story building in York.

Also in 1847, their oldest son Glenalvin J. Goodridge, who had been a teacher in the African-American school, took up Daguerreotype photography. Glenalvin initially studied under a traveling photographer who rented space in their old business center, then established his own practice. The top floor of the new Centre Hall was designed to house Glenalvin's "Skylight Studio", which became the longest-lasting early photography studio in York. Younger brothers Wallace and William also learned the photography business.

Goodridge businesses advertised via newspapers and in the city directory. They incorporated wood engraved illustrations as well as poetry in their advertisements, which they sometimes combined, advertising multiple Goodridge businesses in a single column. Goodridge's use of ads dropped off in the 1850s, possibly in an effort to keep a lower profile following the Fugitive Slave Act. It is also possible that Goodridge's wife Evalina was the principal designer of their advertisements, as her death in 1852 also coincided with the reduction in advertising.

By 1856 Goodridge owned at least 12 properties in York including Centre Hall. He was a man of wealth and influence, and a good friend of fellow abolitionist Frederick Douglass.

== Underground Railroad activism ==
The Goodridge house had a hand-dug hideaway under the kitchen that was discovered during renovations in the 1900s. Goodridge is believed to have hidden freedom seekers there, and also in a hideaway under the stairs in Centre Hall, before transporting them East across the Susquehanna River to Columbia or on to Philadelphia. His Reliance Line rail cars may have had secret compartments that were used to transport people to freedom; the rail depot was just a short distance North of the house. The term "Underground Railroad" is believed to have been coined in reference to the Susquehanna Valley, where runaway slaves vanished as if on an underground railroad.

Goodridge is most prominently noted for conducting William Parker to safety following the Christiana Resistance in 1851, along with one or more fugitive slaves Parker and his wife were protecting on their farm in Christiana. Goodridge is believed to have helped Parker escape slavery himself in 1840, and they continued to be friends and associates in the intervening decade. The stress of the events of 1851 may have contributed to Goodridge's wife's death, in 1852, of a heart condition.

Goodridge also conducted Osborne Perry Anderson along the Underground Railroad following John Brown's raid on Harpers Ferry in 1859.

Because of the secretive nature of the Underground Railroad, it may never be known how many enslaved people Goodridge conducted along the network to freedom.

== Loss and tragedy ==
One of the services Goodridge offered to the community was to secure loans with his property. During 1856–1858, Goodridge defaulted on loans held by himself and others and was forced to declare bankruptcy. The sheriff auctioned off all of his property, and Goodridge returned to barbering as his main source of income. While there was a financial panic in 1857, it did not have a strong negative effect on York businessmen in general. That the banks called Goodridge's loans may have been related to the Dredd Scott Decision and an increasing awareness of Goodridge's activism as an abolitionist in a predominantly Democratic county supportive of slaveholders' property rights. The panic also adversely affected the railroad industry, in which Goodridge was invested.

Two months after Centre Hall and other properties were auctioned off, Glenalvin J. Goodridge, whose photography studio was in Centre Hall, also defaulted on a loan. Glenalvin and his wife, Rhoda Grey Goodridge, owned multiple properties in the same block as the first Goodridge home, in what is now the York Historic District. Their property included three houses, a stable, and extra parcels of land around them. They were reduced to one house following his father's loss of the family estate and business center. Glenalvin went back to teaching for a year, while temporarily relocating the studio to Philadelphia Street. He was able to find a new space on Centre Square to rent after that, and even established a second photography studio in Columbia, Pennsylvania, before tragedy struck in 1862.

In 1862, a young white woman accused Glenalvin J. Goodridge of rape. Though the case was very weak and Glenalvin had an alibi, the father of four was found guilty and sent to prison for 18 months, where he caught tuberculosis. William Goodridge campaigned tirelessly for his son's release and pardon. He collected 106 signatures on a petition to the governor and when that failed, organized a letter-writing campaign on his son's behalf. In 1865, Glenalvin was finally released by the governor, on the condition that he leave Pennsylvania.

In 1867, William C. Goodridge escorted Glenalvin and his family to Saginaw, Michigan, where Mary, Wallace, and William had already moved. He then returned to settle business in York before moving to Minneapolis to live with his daughter Emily and her family. Glenalvin died in November 1867 of the tuberculosis he caught while imprisoned. In 1868, his two oldest sons also died, possibly of the same disease that took their brother.

In January 1868, a fire burned down the house in Saginaw that contained Glenalvin's extensive library and collection of negatives and photographs. Any pictures the family possessed in Saginaw after that were likely destroyed in another fire that took out the photography studio in 1872. Though the remaining Goodridge brothers were able to rescue some equipment from that fire, which started accidentally at a restaurant down the block, at least 1,000 negatives were destroyed. They built a new studio in 1873, but much of Glenalvin's photographic work, including most any pictures he might have taken of his wife, children, siblings and parents, was lost.

Wallace L. Goodridge later recognized a son in his will: Wallace L. Goodridge Jr., born in 1862. It is possible that the young white woman, gotten pregnant by Wallace, decided to accuse his richer older brother in the hopes of getting some money out of the family. (Young William O. Goodridge testified this was the case, at the time; Wallace had already moved to Michigan that summer and was not available to testify at Glenalvin's trial. Efforts to secure a retrial failed.) Wallace did not marry until 1889, and had no other children. Between 1865 and 1890, when Rhoda remarried, Wallace supported Glenalvin's widow and her remaining children in his own home.

== Historical and family legacy ==
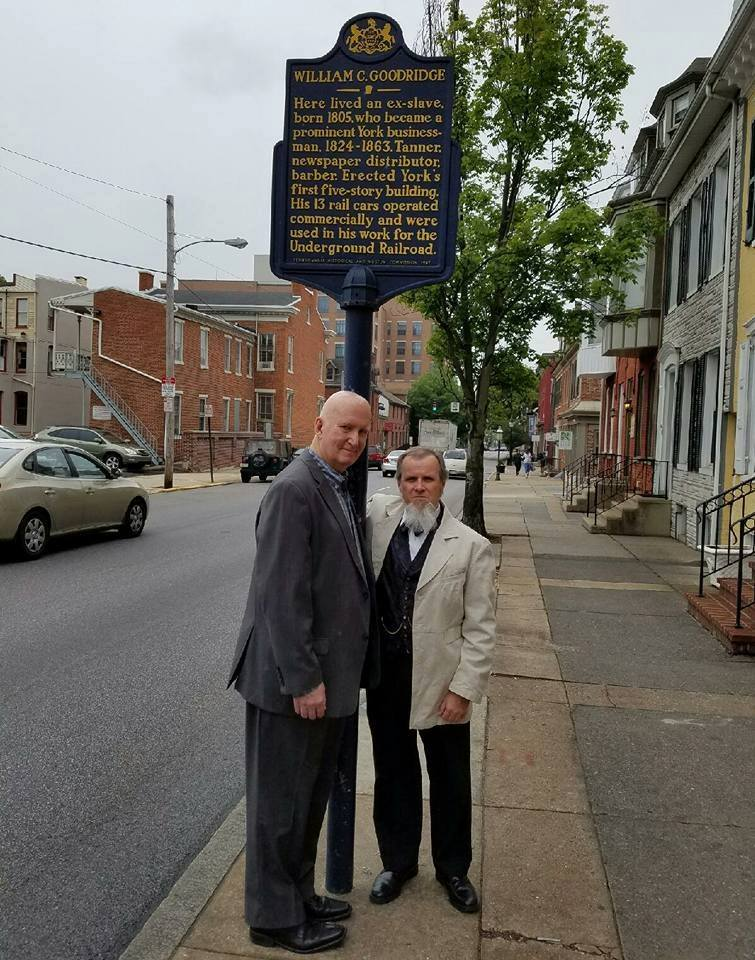
York County historians Georg R. Sheets and Terrence "Dutchie" Downs under the historical marker in front of Goodridge's home in York, now the Goodridge Freedom Center

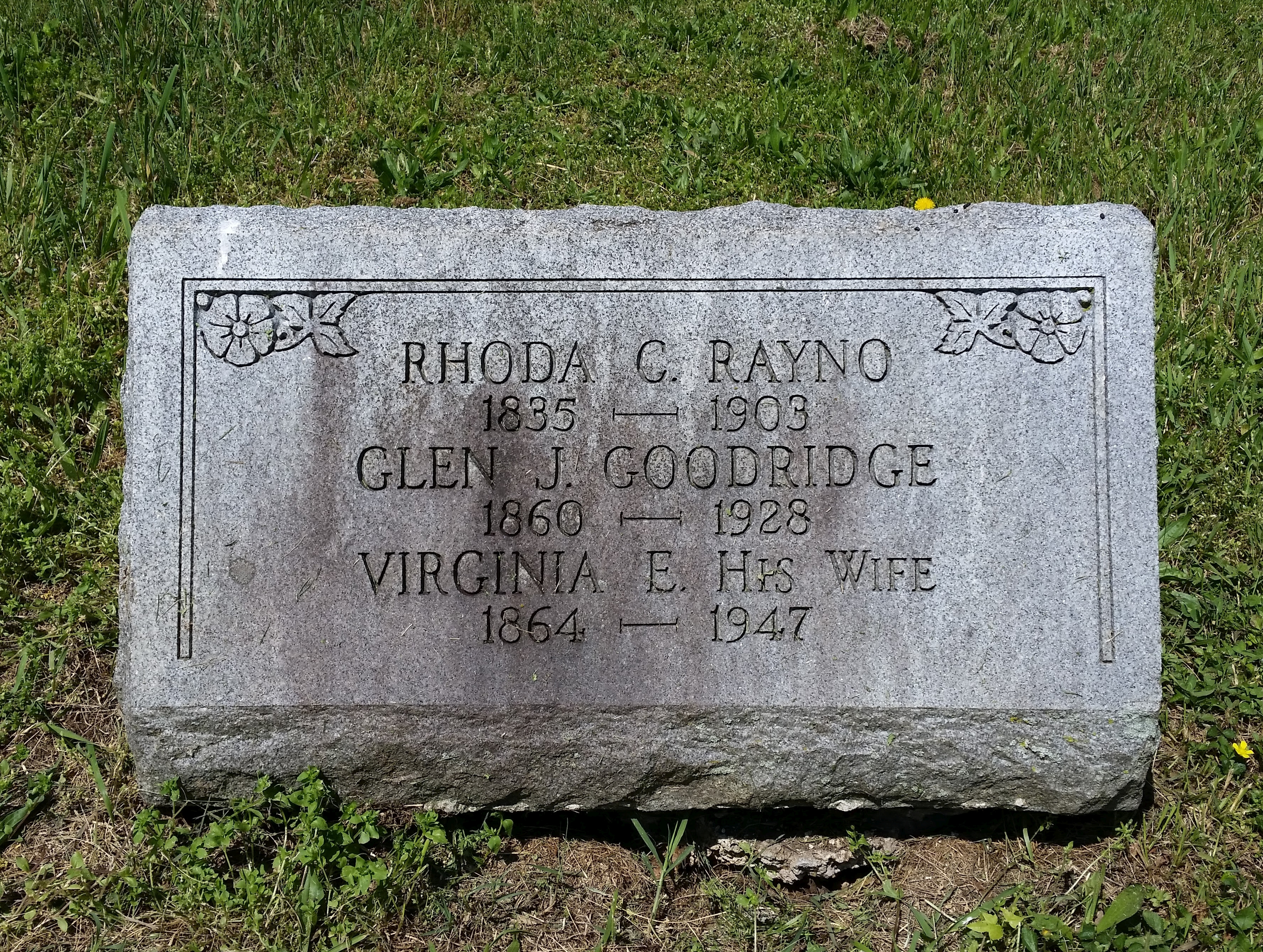
Glenalvin J. Goodridge Jr. is buried in Lebanon Cemetery in York, Pennsylvania.

The Goodridge home still stands at 123 E. Philadelphia St, in York, Pennsylvania. An historic marker is outside the building, erected by the State of Pennsylvania and dedicated on December 17, 1987. The historic site was given over to the Crispus Attucks Association of York in 1993. The Goodridge Freedom Center and Underground Railroad Museum is located there, owned and operated by the Association. It opened to the public in May 2016.

The William C. Goodridge Academy serves grades 6–12 in York. Located at 329 Lindberg Ave, it is part of the School District of the City of York.

A large mural about Goodridge faces West on a building on W. Market St in York, next to the Penn Market. Painted by Don and Jared Gray, the mural stands 24 feet wide and 23 feet tall, and was completed in June 2000. The mural features one of Goodridge's advertisements for the Goodridge Building and Skylight Studio, which was originally located at the square a few blocks East of the mural. It also shows a barber pole, a rail car, and representations of Goodridge as a baby, a young boy starting his indenture, and a successful free businessman.

Goodridge's eldest daughter Emily O. Goodridge Grey and her husband Ralph Toyner Grey relocated to Territorial St. Anthony, Minnesota, in the mid-1850s, where they became prominent members of Black American Society in the area that became Minneapolis. Emily wrote a record of her trip to the frontier and settlement there, "The Black Community in Territorial St. Anthony: a Memoir", which was printed in the Minnesota Historical Society Journal in 1984, with a foreword by editor Patricia Harpole. The Emily O. Goodridge Grey Accelerated Charter School, named after her, operated in Minneapolis from 2008 to 2015.

The story of Emily O. Goodridge Grey's involvement in the freeing of Eliza Winston in Minneapolis in 1860 is featured in several works by William D. Green, vice president of the Minnesota Historical Society governing board. She and her husband are honored as prominent abolitionists by Lakewood Cemetery in Minneapolis, where they and other members of their family were laid to rest.

The Goodridge Brothers' photography studio, founded in 1847 by Glenalvin J. Goodridge on Centre Square in York, relocated to East Saginaw, Michigan, in 1863. It was operated by the three brothers until Glenalvin's death in 1867, then by Wallace L. and William O. Goodridge until William's death in 1890. Though Glenalvin's son Glenn Jr. and William's two sons worked in the studio at various times, none took it over; the studio closed in 1922 when Wallace died. During that time the Goodridge Brothers' studio, which always demonstrated excellent technique and kept up with the latest technology, had documented the logging industry and other developments in Saginaw, and come to be internationally recognized, with photos included in the 1889 Universal Exposition in Paris and later at the 1893 Columbian Exposition in Chicago. Their photos were also included in several publications and popular postcards, and hundreds of portraits are known to have been taken in the studio. The accomplishments of the Goodridge photographers were documented in an extensive biography and professional review called Enterprising Images: The Goodridge Brothers, African American Photographers, 1847–1922. by J. Jezierski, published in 2000. Emily O. Goodridge's great-granddaughter Catherine Grey Hurley was acknowledged for her assistance with the book.

Hurley was also interviewed by York historian Georg R. Sheets, who published two short booklets about the Goodridge family based on that and other research: A Brief History of the Goodridge Family in York, Pennsylvania, (June 1990), and Eyewitness to the Goodridge Story in York (June 2017).

A historical exhibit about the Goodridge Brothers' photography coordinated by Nancy Watts traveled around Michigan and was subsequently donated to the Goodridge Freedom Center in York. The research materials used by Jezierski are housed at Saginaw Valley State University's Zahnow Library (Michigan), some of which was included in the award-winning 2014 documentary film Through a Lens Darkly. The Public Libraries of Saginaw (Michigan) also house some Goodridge Brothers' materials, as does Saginaw's Castle Museum.

Mary Goodridge married John Nichols in 1862 and established the Nichols Wig and Style shop at 121 N. Franklin St. in Saginaw, Michigan, where she mentored many young women and partnered with her sister-in-law Gertrude Watson Goodridge after William's death.

Glenalvin J. Goodridge Jr. returned to York with his mother in 1891 and re-established the family barbershop there by 1898. He died in 1928. He and his wife, Virginia E. (Brown) Goodridge, had no children. They are both buried in Lebanon Cemetery in York, where they share a headstone with Glenalvin's mother Rhoda.

Goodridge has been portrayed by reenactors Lee Smallwood and Robert Brinson.
