= Photography in the United States =

The practice and appreciation of photography in the United States began in the 19th century, when various advances in the development of photography took place and after daguerreotype photography was introduced in France in 1839. The earliest commercialization of photography was made in the country when Alexander Walcott and John Johnson opened the first commercial portrait gallery in 1840. In 1866, the first color photograph was taken. Only in the 1880s, would photography expand to a mass audience with the first easy-to-use, lightweight Kodak camera, issued by George Eastman and his company.

== Nineteenth century ==
=== Daguerreotype ===
In 1839, the daguerreotype photographic process invented in France was introduced into the United States by an Englishman named D.W. Seager, who took the first photograph of a view of St. Paul’s Church and a corner of the Astor House in Lower Manhattan in New York City. Painter and inventor Samuel Finley Breese Morse had met Louis Daguerre in Paris in the spring of 1839, becoming the first American to see his photographic process and becoming enamored with it as a result. When he returned to the United States later that year, he enthusiastically promoted the daguerreotype while hailing Seager's prototypical image. Morse had painted The Gallery of the Louvre in 1833, and the appeal of the medium of the daguerreotype was an obvious one to him: it was a means of making faithful copies of artworks, in addition to anything else that would be still in front of the slow eye of the camera.

=== Portraiture ===
Given the long exposure time initially required to capture an image, sitters had to be immobilized, so buildings and other stationary objects proved to be the most practical to photograph. However, as the photographic chemistry and techniques improved, American inventors were soon winning prizes for innovative techniques at world expositions, establishing the US as a leader in the developing art field. Thus, it became easier to make images of the human subject with this new technique.

At a time when the painted portrait was a luxury few could afford, the daguerreotype arrived with the promise of letting virtually everyone establish a visual self-image, even if it might be only slightly bigger than a large postage stamp. The working-class daguerreotype studios charged 50 cents an image, the equivalent of half a day's labor. It wasn't cheap, but it was far less expensive than a portrait. Not all of the portraits were successful, however. The subject was generally required to sit without moving from between five or ten seconds (at best) and several minutes. The discomfort of having one's head fitted into the frame of an iron positioning apparatus could produce startling results: stony stares, wild-eyed glares, and eyes frightened by the staring lens of the camera. Despite some unflattering images, however, photography was establishing a new standard for visual representation. The portrait's most treasured quality was that it was an exactly corresponding record of what had existed in front of the lens.

In addition to the private aspect of portraiture, there was a public one. Portrait galleries sprang up in urban centers around the country, and the aspiring middle class would go to view the portraits on display. Daguerreotypes of various public figures - often enlarged and hand-colored - would line the walls of these galleries. Viewers would admire and study the images for signs of distinction, substance, and character that they felt the subjects of the portraits represented.

In 2021, the Smithsonian American Art Museum (SAAM) in Washington, D.C., announced the acquisition of a private collection of early photographs, taken between the 1840s and the mid-1920s, with 40 daguerreotypes made by three 19th-century African American photographers. The collection includes photographs of African American men and women abolitionists and documents the work of 19th-century African American photographers such as James Presley Ball, Glenalvin Goodridge and Augustus Washington.

=== The Civil War ===
On April 15, 1861, Abraham Lincoln called up 75,000 militiamen to put down an insurrection of southern states after Confederate forces attacked Fort Sumter on April 12–14, 1861. Mathew B. Brady, one of the preeminent photographers of the day, secured permission from President Lincoln to follow the troops, for what everyone thought would be a short and glorious war. He only saw the first major engagement, The First Battle of Bull Run, and lost his wagons and other equipment in the chaos of the Union defeat. Deciding to forgo any further action himself, Brady instead put together a corps of field photographers who, together with those employed by the Union Army and Alexander Gardner, made the first extended coverage of a war.

The war photographers worked with collodion wet-plate photography, a photographic process invented by the Englishman Frederick Scott Archer. Unlike a daguerreotype, the process produced a negative, which could be replicated. A major complication, however, was that the photographer had only ten minutes from the coating of the plate to the development of the photograph in which to take the picture. One needed a portable darkroom to use it properly. The photographers could only depict such scenes as strategic sites, camp scenes, preparation for or retreat from action, and, on occasion, the grisly aftermath of battle. This was due to the chaotic and dangerous nature of the battlefield.

=== The beginnings of the consumer camera ===
With the progression from the collodion process to the dry-plate process, amateur photography was already on the rise in the United States. However, there was the issue of the annoyance of changing the photographic plates between each shot. The lasting solution to this issue was a product introduced by George Eastman in 1884: a flexible, gelatin-coated paper, followed closely by a holder for a 24-frame roll. Soon after this, Eastman introduced Eastman American film, which featured a thin gelatin layer that was removed from the paper backing after development for additional clarity in making prints. In 1888, Eastman's company issued the first easy-to-use, lightweight Kodak camera. It was priced at $25, loaded with a hundred frames, and was almost instantly popular.

Users would mail the camera back to Kodak, where the used film was developed and the camera was reloaded with a fresh roll of frames and was then mailed back to the customer along with the previous batch of printed images. In 1889, Eastman's company began producing cellulose nitrate, or celluloid, film, which didn't require the Eastman American film's paper backing. This last innovation paved the way for motion picture film stock. However, it was highly flammable and this material eventually gave way to cellulose acetate.

=== Notable nineteenth-century photographers ===
In the nineteenth century, various American photographers started to develop new methods and techniques for photographs. Among others, these include

- Mathew Brady (1822–1896), photographer
- Eadweard Muybridge (1830–1904), photographer
- John Moran (1831–1902), photographer
- Jacob Riis (1849–1914), photographer
- Gertrude Käsebier (1852–1934), photographer
- Alfred Stieglitz (1864–1946), photographer
- Edward S. Curtis (1868–1952), photographer

== See also ==
- History of photography
- List of American photographers
- History of the camera
- Visual art of the United States

Legal issues surrounding photography in the United States

- Photography and the law#United States
- Freedom of panorama in the United States
