= Goodridge =

Goodridge may refer to:

== Places ==
- Goodridge, Alberta
- Goodridge, Minnesota, a US city
- Goodridge Township, Pennington County, Minnesota, USA

== Other ==
- Goodridge v. Department of Public Health, a United States court case in the state of Massachusetts concerning same-sex marriage rights.
- Goodridge (surname)
