= Ryan Walters =

Ryan Walters may refer to:

- Ryan Walters (ice hockey) (born 1991), American ice hockey player
- Ryan Walters (American football) (born 1986), American football player and coach
- Ryan Walters (American politician) (born 1985), American politician
- Ryan Walters (Barbadian politician), Barbadian politician

== See also ==
- Ryan Walter (born 1958), Canadian ice hockey centre
- Ryan Wolters (born 1977), American tennis player
