= Shiloh, Mississippi =

Unincorporated community in Mississippi, United States

- Ghost town
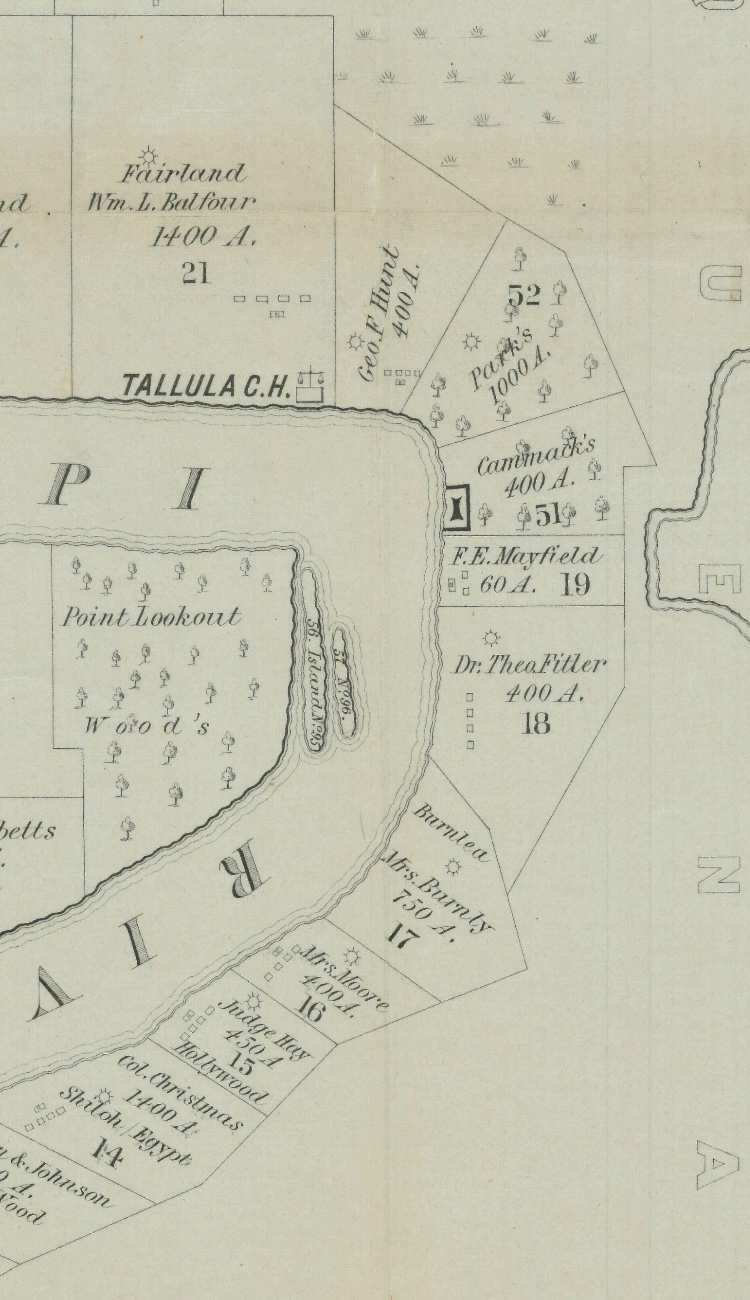
- Part of Issaquena County along the Mississippi River mapped sometime between 1866 and 1874; Col. Christmas' Shiloh Egypt plantation had cabins that had formerly been used as slave quarters, a main residence, and a cotton gin

- Location within Mississippi Location within the United States
- Coordinates: 32°40′18″N 91°05′26″W
- Country: United States
- State: Mississippi
- County: Issaquena
- Elevation: 102 ft (31 m)
- Time zone: UTC-6 (Central (CST))
  - Summer (DST): UTC-5 (CDT)
- GNIS feature ID: 711155

Shiloh is a ghost town located in Issaquena County, Mississippi, United States. Shiloh Landing was its port on the Mississippi River.

Shiloh began as a plantation owned by Richard Christmas, who in 1860 held 160 enslaved laborers there. A post office operated under the name Shiloh Landing from 1892 to 1901 and under the name Shiloh from 1901 to 1932.

In 1900, Shiloh had a post office and a population of 78.

Nothing remains of Shiloh, which today is uninhabited and covered by forest to river's edge.

== See also ==
- Eliza Winston – American slave (1830–?)
