= Thomas J. Hylton =

Thomas J. Hylton, (Tom Hylton, Thomas Hylton Born 1948) a Pulitzer Prize-winning journalist from Pottstown, Pennsylvania, is the author of a book called Save Our Land, Save Our Towns and host of a public television documentary, Saving Pennsylvania on YouTube.

Born in Wyomissing, Pennsylvania, in 1948, Hylton graduated from Kutztown University in 1970 and began working as a staff writer for The Mercury in Pottstown the following year. He won a Pulitzer Prize in 1990 for Mercury editorials about a bond issue for the preservation of farmland and open space. He resigned from the newspaper in 1994 to write his book and organize a non-profit dedicated to land use planning and community building in Pennsylvania. Tom still writes for the Mercury as of 2026. And Tom is an active board member for the Pottstown School District.

Hylton's book Save Our Land, Save Our Towns: A Plan for Pennsylvania was published in 1995 by RB Books and illustrated with photography by Blair Seitz. It won the National Trust for Historic Preservation award.
