= Peter Applebome =

American journalist and writer (born 1949)

Peter Applebome (born July 3, 1949) is an American editor and writer whose positions at The New York Times have included Deputy National Editor, Metropolitan Page Columnist and Houston and Atlanta Bureau Chief.

Applebome was born in New York City and grew up in Great Neck, N.Y. He graduated from Duke University with a bachelor's in history in 1971 and from Northwestern University Journalism School in 1974. He worked at a newspapers in Corpus Christi and in Dallas and at Texas Monthly magazine, where he was a Senior Editor. He joined the New York Times in 1987 as a national correspondent and then as bureau chief in Houston. He moved to Atlanta as Southern Bureau chief in 1989 and served in that job for five years. Since then he has covered education and culture, served as Deputy Metropolitan Editor and for six years wrote the Our Towns column, which consisted of news, features, tales and analysis of life in the New York, New Jersey and Connecticut suburbs, exurbs and far-flung towns outside New York City. He has taught courses in journalism at Princeton University, Duke University, and Vanderbilt University. He has won various awards, the most unusual being the 1985 Imitation Hemingway Award set in the singles bars of Dallas. His books include Dixie Rising: How the South is Shaping American Values, Politics and Culture (Times Books, 1996) and Scout's Honor: A Father's Unlikely Foray into the Woods (Harcourt, 2003).

Applebome's essay "Civil War Vapors Remain" appears in The Grand Review: The Civil War Continues to Shape America, published in 2000 by Bold Print, Inc. of York, PA. The book includes a history by Georg R. Sheets of the Grand Review of the Armies held May 23–24, 1865 to celebrate the end of the American Civil War, as well as commentary by Applebome, Governor L. Douglas Wilder, and Dr. Charles Reagan Wilson, and first-look photographs of the collection of the National Civil War Museum.

== Books ==
- Scout's Honor: A Father's Unlikely Foray Into the Woods (2004, Tandem Library)
- Dixie Rising: How the South is Shaping American Values, Politics and Culture (1996, Times Books)
