= Blair Seitz =

American photographer and photojournalist

Blair Seitz is an accomplished American photographer and photojournalist. He was awarded a fellowship grant from the Pennsylvania Council on the Arts and a silver medal in New York's International Film and TV Festival. The American Museum of Natural History, in New York City, and The World Exhibition of Photography, and the Virginia Museum have exhibited his photographs, as have several smaller galleries, including the one he now helps manage, the Art Plus Gallery in Reading, Pennsylvania. His work has also been used to illustrate 21 books and many magazine and newspaper articles and other commercial works, as well as for interior design. He has participated in the Photography for Healing programs at Geisinger Hospital in Danville, Pennsylvania; Hershey Medical Center in Hershey, Pennsylvania; and South Jersey Healthcare in Hammonton, New Jersey. In 2013 RB Books published Seitz's first memoir, highlighting photographs from over ten years of photojournalism in more than twenty countries in Africa, Asia, and Israel/Palestine called Turn the World Around, A Photojournalist Discovers Paths to Peace Traveling a War-torn Planet.

== Career ==
Blair Seitz earned his BS in Sociology in 1967, and also took UVA extension courses in photography from the University of Virginia, in Richmond.

Seitz started his career working with UN agencies and Camera Press, London, traveling throughout Africa and Asia to illustrate UN reports and journalistic assignments. Periodicals around the world have carried Seitz' work, including Time, Newsweek, the Guardian, National Geographic Traveler, Nation's Business, New York Times Magazine, and Endless Vacations.

In 1972 Blair Seitz ended up in the field working with Dr. James Merriman, now a professor of anthropology and sociology at Wilkes University in Wilkes-Barre, Pennsylvania. Merriman and Seitz, together with Merriman's wife Nancy, worked together to produce a report for Oxfam and the Mennonite Central Committee in Nairobi titled Camels to Cornfields, a narrated slide-set depicting the process of nomad sedentarization subsequent to drought. They went on to become lifelong friends.

In 1983 Seitz began to focus his photography on Pennsylvania and South Jersey. He and his wife, Ruth Hoover Seitz, co-founded the publishing firm RB Books in 1991. She has written the text for many of their 17 books.

== Exhibits ==
Seitz had an exhibit at the Cowan Gallery of Googleworks Center for the Arts running from September–November, 2013. For February–March, 2014, he exhibited at the Art Association of Harrisburg, Pennsylvania. In September–October 2015, the Sordoni Art Gallery at Wilkes University presented the exhibition, Blair Seitz: Aerial Perspectives.

== Publications ==
=== Books - as sole photographer ===
- Amish Ways, by Ruth Hoover Seitz. RB Books (1991) ISBN 9781879441774
- Save Our Land, Save Our Towns: A Plan for Pennsylvania, by Thomas J. Hylton. RB Books (1995) ISBN 9781879441446
- Pennsylvania Heritage: Diversity in Art, Dance, Food, Music, and Customs, by Georg R. Sheets. RB Books, Harrisburg, Pennsylvania, 2001. ISBN 1-879441-82-9
- Yuletide Hearth: Christmas in an 1806 Pennsylvania Farmhouse, by Katharine Z. Okie. RB Books (2002)
- Pennsylvania Yesterday & Today. Voyageur Press, 2007 ISBN 978-0-7603283-0-9

Pennsylvania’s Natural and Cultural Heritage (series)

- Susquehanna Heartland, by Ruth Hoover Seitz. RB Books (1992) ISBN 9781879441781
- Pennsylvania’s Natural Beauty, by Ruth Hoover Seitz. RB Books (1993) ISBN 9781879441798
- Pittsburgh, by Ruth H Seitz. Foreword by Myron Cope. RB Books (1997) ISBN 9781879441965
- Pennsylvania's Tapestry: Scenes from the Air, by Ruth Hoover Seitz. RB Books (1998) ISBN 9781879441804
- Pennsylvania's Capitol, by Ruth Hoover Seitz; foreword by Ruthann Hubbert-Kemper. RB Books (2000) ISBN 9781879441958
- Pennsylvania's Northeast: Poconos, Endless Mountains and Urban Centers, by Ruth Hoover Seitz. RB Books (2000) ISBN 9781879441811
- Gardens of Philadelphia: Gardens and Arboretums of the City and Delaware Valley, by John G. Hope. RB Books (2002) ISBN 9781879441910
- Philadelphia and its Countryside, by Ruth Hoover Seitz; foreword by James A. Michener. RB Books (2003). ISBN 9781879441934

Insights (series)

- Amish Values: Wisdom That Works, by Ruth Hoover Seitz. RB Books (1996) ISBN 9781879441002
- Gettysburg: Civil War Memories, by Ruth Hoover Seitz. RB Books (1996) ISBN 9781879441019
- Pennsylvania's Scenic Route 6: A Guide to Historic Sites, Towns and Natural Lands, by John G. Hope. RB Books (2002) ISBN 9781879441866

=== Books - as a contributing photographer ===
- The Riddle of Amish Culture, by Donald B. Kraybill (The Johns Hopkins University Press, 1989, 2001)
- Betty Groff Cookbook: Pennsylvania German Recipes, by Betty Groff; with Betty's childhood memories as told to Diane Stonebeck. RB Books, 2001

=== Books - as photographer and author ===
- Harrisburg: Renaissance of a Capital City; Foreword by Mayor Stephen R. Reed. RB Books (1999) ISBN 9781879441996
- Turn the World Around: A Photojournalist Discovers Paths to Peace Traveling a War-torn Planet, RB Books, (January 8, 2013)
