= Eliza Winston =

American slave (1830–?)

Eliza Winston (c. 1830–?) was an enslaved American from Mississippi who was freed from her owners while with them on vacation in Minnesota, a free state. She received a hearing in court via a Freedom suit, where she said she and her late husband had purchased her freedom from a previous owner, but it was not honored. She was freed from her Mississippi owners and possibly aided in getting to Canada, but no definitive account exists for her life afterwards.

== Biography ==
According to Winston's own account, she was born in 1830, though research indicates she was more likely born around 1817. As a child, she was enslaved by Thomas Hopkins on a plantation with her family. In 1822, she was purchased by a man she identified as "Macklemo", or John Christmas McLemore, and the deed of sale listed her as "about five years of age". McLemore was married to Betsy Donelson, who was part of a family of wealthy planters who were prominent in politics. Betsy Donelson's aunt Rachel Donelson was married to Andrew Jackson, dying before his first term as US President, and McLemore once visited Jackson at the White House. McLemore worked as a surveyor and invested in new cities like Memphis. He never enslaved more than ten people at a time in Nashville, but the people he enslaved were constantly changing. After the mid-1820s, the McLemore family suffered financially, defaulted on his investments, and sold off his real estate. In 1834, McLemore's property was seized by the sheriff of Davidson County, and "Eliza" was listed at 17 years old as she was sold at the family estate. She and all the other "property" was purchased by Lucius Polk, a cousin of James K. Polk. Lucius was given the money to buy Winston and the other people enslaved by McLemore by Andrew Jackson, as he was similarly tied to the Donelson family, and was to keep the furniture and captives in trust until they could be given to the McLemore daughters, Mary and Catherine.

Polk transferred Winston and the four other enslaved individuals (Gabriel, Harriet, Malinda, and Julius, who ranged from ages 25 to 8) to his plantation Hamilton Place. In 1840, over 50 people were enslaved on the plantation. The Polk plantation also housed some free African Americans. Many pro-slavery advocates and other notables, like Andrew Jackson and James Kirke Paulding, visited the plantation.

Polk kept Winston in trust until McLemore's daughter Catherine married Thomas Yates Gholson in 1841, who lived in Memphis. After her marriage, Winston was transferred to Catherine, as Jackson had stipulated that the sisters had "separate use" of their new property without regard to any debt their husband might be in. Winston was roughly 25 years old at the time of her transfer, and was the only person enslaved by the Gholson's for most of the time that they enslaved her. During their time in Memphis, Winston attended the First Presbyterian Church in Memphis, which had a mix of free and enslaved parishioners. Catherine had one child and Thomas worked as a lawyer, and then invested in telegraph lines in Louisville, Kentucky which was a financial failure, leading them to the family returning to Tennessee. Soon after, in 1848, Catherine died of consumption, transferring ownership of Winston to Gholson.

While enslaved by Gholson, Winston married a free African American man. The couple gave Gholson savings to purchase a house for them, but Gholson put his own name on the deed. Winston's husband was also required to pay Gholson for any time they spent together. Gholson agreed to free her after Winston and her husband paid him $1000. However, her husband died on a trip to Liberia, where he was hoping to raise funds, before the full price was paid. In 1852, Gholson took on a job reporting for a local newspaper from New Orleans, and likely took Winston with him. However, Gholson soon got into money trouble and "pawned" Winston off to Col. Ralph Christmas around 1853. Christmas gave Gholson $800 for Winston, which was the average price for an enslaved African American woman in Memphis at that time. Gholson used the money to buy land in trust for his daughter.

The Christmas family took Winston to their plantation in Tallula, Mississippi. Gholson tried to earn the money to retrieve Winston, but he died of consumption in 1855. Winston's enslavement became permanent after Gholson's death. Winston worked as a domestic servant nursing her ill mistress at the plantation, and was separated from her family and her church community. She could not claim the land that she and her husband had purchased under Gholson's name, as she was enslaved, and the Christmases did not allow her to marry another freedman. Choosing not to marry an enslaved man, she did not marry again.

== Court case ==
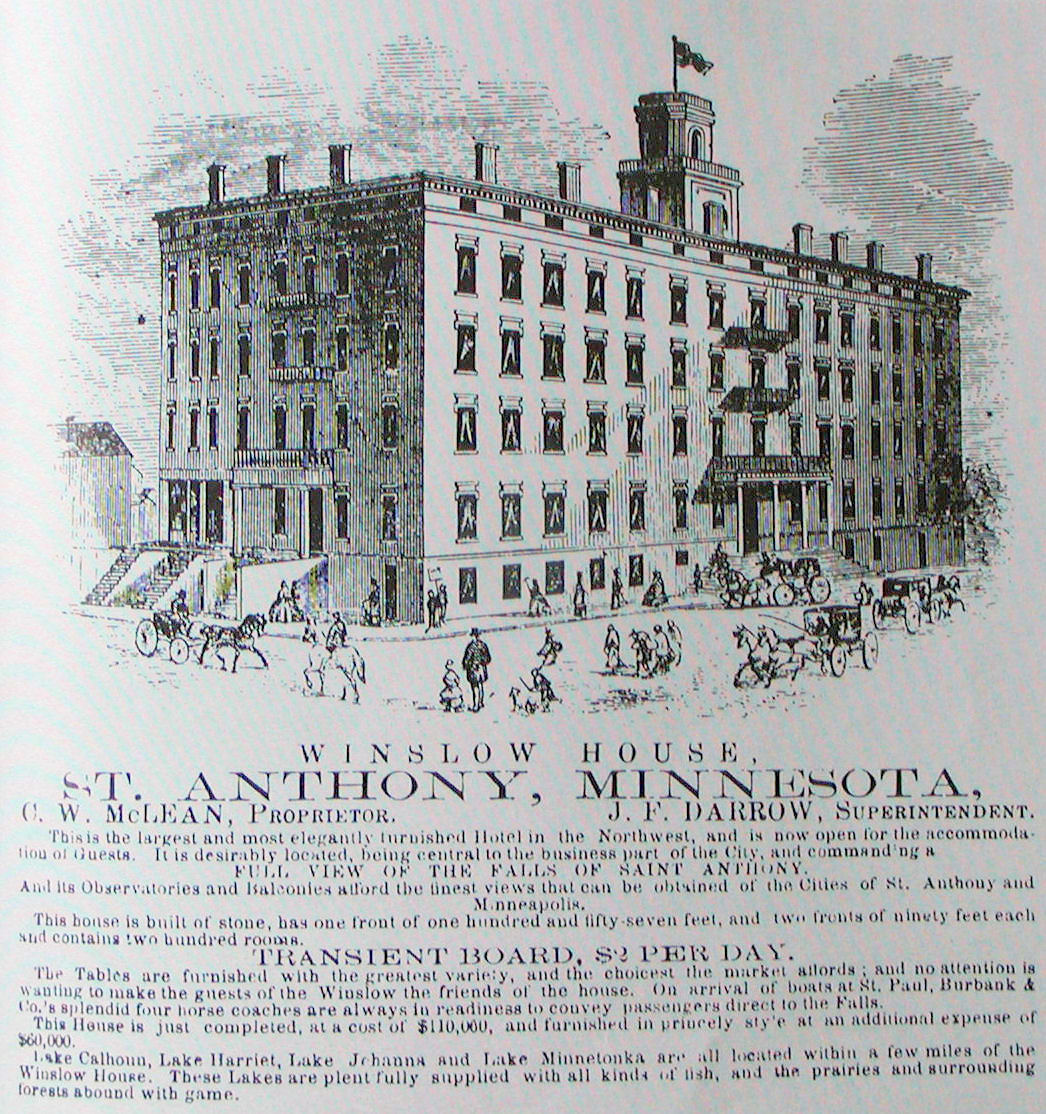
1860 advertisement for the Winslow House

In the summer of 1860 Eliza Winston was taken to St. Anthony, Minnesota by her owners, Richard and Mary Christmas of Issaquena County, Mississippi. During that time it was typical for wealthy southern tourists to escape the yellow fever season by traveling via steamboat up the Mississippi River to northern destinations during the summer months. The hope was for Mary to improve her ailing heath. The Christmases traveled with their five-year-old daughter, Norma, and Winston to the Winslow House in St. Anthony, Minnesota, which was a free state. The Christmases took domestic slaves as servants to care for Mary and the children.

Winston had already determined to seek her freedom there and told her story to Ralph and Emily Goodridge Grey, who were free black citizens and abolitionists with strong local ties. The Greys worked with local abolitionists, such as W.D. Babbit, Ariel S. Bigelow, and William S. King, to free Winston. On August 21, Grey, Babbit, and Grey's white friend Mrs Gates, filed a complaint which asserted that Winston was being "restrained of her liberty by her master.".

At this time, the Christmases had moved from the Winslow House to a country house on Lake Harriet. When the Hennepin County sheriff arrived, the Christmas family at first hid Winston, but did not resist further when she was located. Mary Christmas ordered Winston to flee, but Winston left slowly and told the sheriff that she wished to be free. Abolitionists accompanied the sheriff.

Minnesota was a free state, having banned slavery in their 1857 state constitution, and Judge Charles Vandenburgh agreed to hear her case. According to interpretations of the Dred Scott case of 1857 which had been announced a few months earlier, Winston would return to slavery if she returned to a slave state. Local businessmen and others who feared that discouraging slaveholders from visiting would affect their livelihood went to the courthouse to make their opinions known. The Saint Anthony Weekly Express opined that the event would damage the tourism trade.

On August 21, 1860, after a hearing, the judge ruled that Winston was a free woman. The Christmases attorney had argued that Winston's enslavement was legal; Winston's attorney read a single sentence from the state constitution. Judge Vanderburgh ruled in Winston's flavor. The courtroom scene soon became chaotic. That evening, a pro-slavery mob surrounded the Greys' home and demanded that Winston be returned to the Christmases. Three days later, Winston filed an affidavit telling her side of the story.

Some scholars believe that with the aid of people in the Underground Railroad, Winston was already on her way to Windsor, Ontario Canada, which had abolished slavery. Other accounts of her life have Winston relocating to Detroit.

== See also ==
- William C. Goodridge, abolitionist father of Emily O. (Goodridge) Grey.
- Shiloh, Mississippi

== Bibliography ==
- Lehman, Christopher P. (2024). It Took Courage: Eliza Winston's Quest for Freedom. Minnesota Historical Society Press. ISBN 978-1-68134-282-5
