= Georg R. Sheets =

American historian (1947–2020)

- Born: April 16, 1947; Preston County, West Virginia, U.S.
- Died: February 24, 2020 (aged 72); Camp Hill, Pennsylvania, U.S.
- Occupations: Writer, Editor, Historian, Publisher, Public Relations
- Writing career
- Notable works: To the Setting of the Sun: The Story of York; The Grand Review: The Civil War Continues to Shape America

Georg Richard Sheets (April 16, 1947 – February 24, 2020) was an American historian, author, and editor, best known for his documentation of the history of York County, Pennsylvania and of the American Civil War. Sheets started his career as a journalist, and was commissioned to write several works on local, state, and organizational history in York and Harrisburg. He contributed substantially to research on William C. Goodridge and family that led to the establishment of the William C. Goodridge Freedom Center and Underground Railroad Museum.

== Early life and education ==
Sheets was born in 1947 in Preston County, West Virginia.

His parents brought him to York at the age of eight, and he grew up there. Sheets attended West York Area Senior High School and went on to get a Bachelor of Arts focused on English and Education at Youngstown State University in Ohio. He also did graduate work at the Pennsylvania State University and spent some time studying in France.

== Career ==
After graduating from Youngstown State University, Sheets taught high school English in Youngstown, Ohio, then began working in journalism. Sheets spent some time as a reporter for The York Dispatch in York, Pennsylvania, then traveled to Paris, France, where he spent three years studying art and other subjects while also teaching businessmen and women English as a second language, and translating.

On his return to York, Sheets worked as a public relations consultant for businesses and individuals until 1975, when he was hired to be Director of Public Relations by President Ray A. Miller of York College of Pennsylvania. Before that he had been public relations director of York Little Theater (now The Belmont Theatre). By this time he was well known for his work with the deaf and hard of hearing. He developed and taught the first sign language course at York College, was a member of the International Registry of Interpreters for the Deaf, and arranged for tours for the Deaf and Hard of Hearing at the Historical Society of York County. Sheets worked as the publicity director at York College from 1975 to 1980.

Sheets resigned from York College in 1980 in order to research and write his first book, To the Setting of the Sun: The Story of York, which was published in 1981 with a foreword by Pennsylvania Governor Dick Thornburgh. Setting sold out of its first printing of 6,000 copies in a month and was immediately submitted for a second printing. The photo editor of the book was Jerry Sweitzer, who was also responsible for the "Partners in progress" section at the back of the book, where members of the York Chamber of Commerce agreed to pay to have their history included. The book was sponsored by the Historical Society of York as well as the Chamber of Commerce. It was printed on P.H. Glatfelter paper at Maple Press, in York. It is 8 1/2 inches by 11 1/2 inches and three quarters of an inch thick. Illustrations include watercolors, pen and ink drawings, photographs, engravings, newspaper clippings, and signs, with a section of color plates in addition to black and white illustrations throughout. A revised and updated edition was put out in November 2002 by the American Historical Press under the title York County: To the Setting of the Sun : An Illustrated History ( ISBN 978-1892724328).

During his research for Setting, Sheets learned of the national historical importance of William C. Goodridge. His editor in California put him in touch with historian John Jezierski, of Saginaw, Michigan; Some of Sheets' research was contributory to Jezierski's substantial work on Goodridge photography, called Enterprising Images: The Goodridge Brothers, African American Photographers, 1847–1922. Sheets spent much of the next ten years researching the Goodridge Family, including two interviews with Emily O. Goodridge's great-granddaughter Catherine Grey Hurley. Sheets' research resulted in a small booklet published by The Library Shop at Martin Library with financial support from the Glatfelter Insurance Company, in June 1990.

According to the "About the Author" section of that booklet, Sheets wrote magazine and newspaper articles as a freelance writer on an ongoing basis, including pieces in The Philadelphia Inquirer, the Baltimore Sunday Sun, the Deaf American Magazine, and Firehouse Magazine.

During that same time, Sheets was hired by the Agricultural and Industrial Museum of York County to compose a survey of the Agricultural and Industrial Heritage of York County. Made in York was a hefty volume that continues to be recommended for those who are interested in the industrial history of the area.

Georg Sheets was curator of the John Harris/Simon Cameron Mansion Museum and Galleries of the Historical Society of Dauphin County in the 1990s. During his time there, they presented an exhibit called "Simon Cameron: In the Eye of the Civil War" which presented personal effects, including letters, of the former Senator from Pennsylvania and Lincoln's Ambassador to Russia.

In 2000, he contributed the historical portion to The Grand Review: The Civil War Continues to Shape America, a book on the glorious two-day parade in Washington, D.C. that marked the end of the Civil War, May 23 & 24, 1865. The softcover book has about 140 illustrations over 132 pages and was published by Bold Print, Inc. of York, PA. It was nominated for the Pulitzer prize.

In 2002, the Pennsylvania Capitol Preservation Committee turned to Sheets to document the work of artist Violet Oakley at the Pennsylvania State Capitol in Harrisburg. Similarly, at other times, Asbury United (First) Methodist Church, the York County Bar Association, and PeoplesBank hired him to put their organizational histories into book form.

Later in life, Sheets was hired by the York County Library System as their Planned Giving Officer to support institutional development. He has also edited a complementary regional guide to art, culture, heritage, tourism and literacy called Showcase Now! Magazine for several years.

=== Community service ===
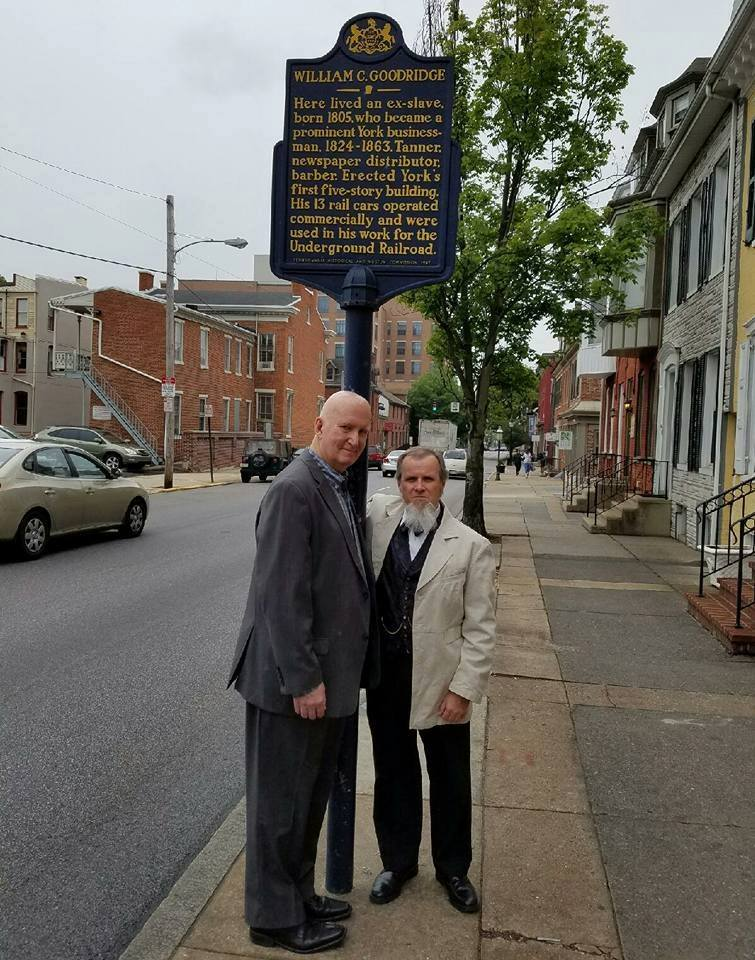
York County historians Georg R. Sheets and Terrence "Dutchie" Downs stand by the historical marker in front of the Goodridge Freedom Center in York PA. The site is the historical home of William C. Goodridge, and a stop on the Underground Railroad.

Sheets served as president and then Past President of the York Twinning Association, which connects residents of York to residents of its sister cities Arles, France (since 1954) and Leinfelden-Echterdingen, Germany (since 1981). He was also a board member of the York Little Theater, the Strand-Capital Performing Arts Center, and the York Cerebral Palsy Home. Sheets further served as the Vice President of both the York County Council for the Deaf and Hard of Hearing and the York Arts Council, in the 1970s. In 1982 he was co-chair, with Annette Guilfoyle, of the Victorian Heritage Festival.

Sheets served as a member of the Board of Directors of the Historical Society of York County and spent three years as Director of the Dauphin County Historical Society in Harrisburg, PA.

Sheets was also a supporter of the William C. Goodridge Freedom Center and Underground Railroad Museum, in historical downtown York, PA. He helped plan and present the museum's opening in May 2016 and gave a talk there on June 2, 2017, for which his publication company, Showcase Now, produced a pamphlet titled, Eyewitness to the Goodridge Story in York.

== Publications ==
=== Books - as author ===
- To the Setting of the Sun: The Story of York, Foreword by Governor Dick Thornburgh. Windsor Publications, Woodland Hills, California, 1981. Second edition, 2002 by the American historical Press. ISBN 978-0-89781-023-4
- Children of the Circuit Riders: The Story of Methodism in America, Asbury United (First) Methodist Church, York, PA, 1984
- A Brief History of the Goodridge Family in York, Pennsylvania, the Library Shop at Martin Library, York, PA, 1990
- Made in York: A Survey of the Agricultural and Industrial Heritage of York County, Pennsylvania, Published by the Agricultural and Industrial Museum of York County, York, PA, 1991
- Facts and Folklore of York, P.A., Sheets Books, Pression, York, PA, 1993
- Breaking Ground: 50 Years of Excellence in Architecture and Engineering, Buchart-Horn/Basco Associates Inc., York, PA, 1995
- Gettysburg: The Photo Scrapbook, Bold Print, York, PA, 1998
- The Grand Review: The Civil War Continues to Shape America, with commentary by Peter Applebome, Governor L. Douglas Wilder, and Dr. Charles Reagan Wilson, Illustrations by Bradley Schmehl, Bold Print, York, PA, 2000 ISBN 0-9647123-2-6
- Pennsylvania Heritage: Diversity in Art, Dance, Food, Music, and Customs, RB Books, Harrisburg, PA, 2001. Photography by Blair Seitz ISBN 1-879441-82-9
- York County: To the Setting of the Sun, An Illustrated History, American Historical Press, Sun Valley, CA, 2004.
- A Sacred Challenge, Violet Oakley and the Pennsylvania Capitol Murals, The Pennsylvania Capitol Preservation Committee, Harrisburg, PA, 2002 ISBN 0-9643048-6-4
- Lawyers and Leaders: The Role of Lawyers in York County, Pennsylvania, the York County Bar Association, York, PA, 2005
- Facts and Folklore of York County, Pennsylvania (Your A to Z Guide - Attractions to Barbells, Christmas to Fasnachts, Hex Murder to Hog Maw, Shoe House to Zimmerman), the York County Heritage Trust, revised and updated, 2006. ISBN 978-0-97181-086-0
- The Story of PeoplesBank Since 1864, PeoplesBank, 2008

=== Books - as editor ===
- Somewhere in North Africa, by Kenneth L. Benfer, M.D. (1985)
- Inside Westside: Osteopathic Medicine Moves Forward, by Ruth Kammer
- Thoughts on Management, by Russell L. Horn
- Brillhart Genes, by Martin V. Brillhart III
- The School, by Lillian Mickley Juditz, Pine Manor Farm Press, 2002.
- Journals, Journeys and Jawings, by Sue Schmidt, Shade Tree Publishing, 2003.
- The Chester County Heart Book: An Every Person’s Guide to a Healthy Heart, with Eleanor Boggs Shoemaker, 2005.
- Lawyers and Their Ilk, by Jeffrey C. Bortner, Wolf Printing, York, Pennsylvania, 2009.
