= William Parker (abolitionist) =

American former slave and activist (1821-1891)

- Born: 1821; Anne Arundel County, Maryland
- Died: April 14, 1891 (aged 69–70)

William Parker (1821 – April 14, 1891) was an American former slave who escaped from Maryland to Pennsylvania, where he became an abolitionist and anti-slavery activist in Christiana. He was a farmer and led a black self-defense organization. He was notable as a principal figure in the Christiana incident, 1851, also known as the Christiana Resistance. Edward Gorsuch, a Maryland slaveowner who owned four slaves who had fled over the state border to Parker's farm, was killed and other white men in the party to capture the fugitives were wounded. The events brought national attention to the challenges of enforcing the Fugitive Slave Law of 1850.

Upon Gorsuch's death, Parker fled the area, traveling by the Underground Railroad to Rochester, New York, where he met with Frederick Douglass. Douglass arranged for Parker and his party to take a ferry across the Niagara River to Canada, where they gained freedom. Settling in Buxton, Parker learned to read and write, and became a correspondent for Douglass's North Star newspaper.

Forty-one men were indicted in the Christiana case, mostly on charges of treason for trying to thwart the Fugitive Slave Law. A white man, Hanway, was tried in the US District Court in Philadelphia, Judge John K. Kane presiding. After he was acquitted by the jury in 15 minutes, the US Attorney's office decided against trying others.

Frederick Douglass in his autobiography discusses several incidents of resistance to the Fugitive Slave Law. He ranked the events at Christiana that, "more than all else, destroyed the fugitive slave law". Ten years before the Civil War, the events in Christiana generated the following headlines, "Civil War, The First Blow Struck", foreshadowing events to come and highlighting the historical significance of the event.

William Parker became renowned for his activism against slavery, and his bravery in the protection of his and other blacks' civil and political rights. He assisted many runaway slaves and was one of many people in the area involved in the Underground Railroad. His boldness and leadership in the resistance at his house in Christiana inspired people in the neighborhood. For years the events of the resistance there had been largely attributed to the leadership of white Quakers. But accounts reported they were there in support of their black neighbors and were not openly engaged in the resistance.

== Early life ==
William Parker was born into slavery on Roedown Plantation in Anne Arundel County, Maryland, to Louisa Simms, an enslaved woman. His father was likely a white man, as Parker was of mixed race. His mother died when Parker was very young. In his memoir and slave narrative, The Freedman's Story, Parker later wrote that he learned how to fight as a young boy to gain a spot by the warmth of the fire. He dreamed of being free, especially to avoid the regular sale and separation of family members and loved ones. Parker likened the experience of such sales to death and a funeral, as loved ones were usually never seen again. He was approximately seventeen when he ran away to seek his freedom.

== Freedom ==
Parker eventually reached the free state of Pennsylvania, where he settled in Christiana in Lancaster County. He met and married Eliza Ann Elizabeth Howard.

== Abolitionist and self defense ==
After being inspired by speeches by William Lloyd Garrison and Frederick Douglass, Parker encouraged the formation of a mutual protection society of members from the black community. Christiana was not far from the Maryland border. Slave catchers, including the infamous Gap Gang (see Gap, Pennsylvania), came into the area seeking fugitive slaves to return to their slaveholders. They were paid lucrative bounties for their services; they also often kidnapped free blacks to sell into slavery, as demand was so high for slaves in the Deep South that slave catchers were willing to take the risk.

Parker and other members of the mutual protection society used force to prevent the recapture of blacks in the area. They developed an intelligence network to send alerts so that their neighbors would know when slave catchers were about; they would quickly spring into action to retrieve any captives before they could be taken back across state lines. If the laws of the country would not protect them, their family, friends and neighbors, then they would protect themselves.

== Christiana Resistance (earlier known as the Christiana Riot) ==
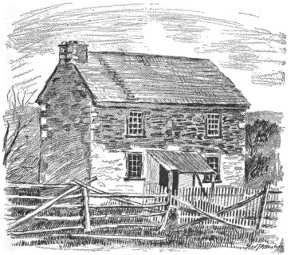
Line drawing of William Parker's house, circa 1851.

On September 11, 1851, Edward Gorsuch, a slaveholder from Maryland, came bearing a warrant to recover his slaves. Gorsuch had information that his slaves were at Parker's farmhouse. Parker had received intelligence that Gorsuch and a federal marshal and others were on their way to his farmhouse, so when Gorsuch arrived, Parker and his fellow defenders were prepared. Eliza, Parker's wife, sounded a horn alerting neighbors that slave catchers were out and that help was needed. Both sides were resolute in their determination to prevail: Parker convinced of the immorality of slavery, and Gorsuch confident in the law and his right to own slaves. There are conflicting stories of why and how the shooting started, but it resulted in the death of Gorsuch and severe wounding of his son Dickinson.

William Parker went into hiding that evening. Using connections on the Underground Railroad to evade federal arrest, he made his way to Rochester, New York. Noted abolitionist and leader Frederick Douglass assisted his passage into Canada by ferry across the Niagara River. He, his wife Eliza, and their three children eventually settled in a black community in Buxton, Ontario, where they purchased a 50-acre (200,000 m^{2}) lot of land. They had more children in Canada.

A federal grand jury indicted 41 men in the events (including Parker in absentia). Believing that a former slave was not the leader, they first tried Castner Hanway, a white neighbor of Parker. He was acquitted by the jury after 15 minutes of deliberation. The Christiana Resistance was a major sore point for slavery proponents in the years leading up to the Civil War.

== Life in Canada ==
Parker continued his activism against slavery from his new home in Canada. He turned his attention to acquiring new skills in the fight to gain freedom and improve the race. He attended school in Buxton to become literate. Shortly thereafter he became the Kent County correspondent for the North Star, Frederick Douglass's newspaper published in Rochester, New York. It promoted freedom, and the intellectual and moral improvement of blacks.

Parker was also elected to and wrote many communications for the Court of Arbitration (the governing body of the Buxton settlement, a self-governed community). He was elected to the Raleigh Township Council from Buxton, and was repeatedly re-elected by both white and black voters.

== Legacy and honors ==
- The Christiana Historical Society installed a plaque in Parker's honor at the memorial to the Resistance in Christiana.
- Buried with Masonic honors following his death on April 14, 1891, at the age of 70 (Kenton, OH)

== In popular culture ==
- 2009, Warren Oree's jazz opera, Never Back Down, is based on the Christiana Resistance; it premiered at Cliveden House, Philadelphia. It was supported by a grant from the Quest for Freedom program, which promoted the city's Underground Railroad history.
- Actresses Zooey Deschanel and Emily Deschanel are descendants of Quaker abolitionists Sarah and Levi Pownall, who owned the land on which the Christiana Resistance occurred and who housed the wounded Dickinson Gorsuch after the confrontation and aided William Parker in his escape.

== Bibliography ==
- W. U. Hensel, "The Christian Riot and The Treason Trials of 1851, An Historical Sketch" (tarlton.law.utexas.edu)]
- William Parker, "The Freedman's Story – Parts I & II", Atlantic Monthly, Vol. XVII, March/February 1866
- Jonathan [Ned] Katz, Resistance at Christiana: The Fugitive Slave Rebellion, Crowell, 1974
- Thomas P. Slaughter, Bloody Dawn – The Christiana Riot and Racial Violence in the Antebellum North, Oxford University Press, 1991
- William Parker and His Impact on the Christiana Resistance (millersville.edu)
- John Gartrell, "Roedown Plantation and the Christiana Resistance" (msa.md.gov/msa/mdslavery)
- Victor Ullman, Look to the North Star – A Life of William King, Toronto: Umbrella Press, 1969
- Frederick Douglass, The Essential Frederick Douglass, Wilder Publications, 2008
- Forbes, David, A True Story of the Christiana Riot, The Sun Printing House, 1898
- Whitson, Thomas, "William Parker, The Hero of the Christiana Riot", Journal of the Lancaster County Historical Society, Vol. 1, No. 1
- Gwendolyn Robinson and John W. Robinson, Seek the Truth – A Story of Chatham's Black Community, 1989
- Bryan Prince, I Came as a Stranger – The Underground Railroad, Tundra Books, 2004
