= Glenalvin Goodridge =

American photographer and teacher

- Born: c. 1829; York, Pennsylvania, U.S.
- Died: November 14, 1867 (aged 37–38); Minneapolis, Minnesota, U.S.
- Resting place: Minneapolis Pioneers and Soldiers Memorial Cemetery
- Occupations: Photographer, teacher
- Spouse: Rhoda Cornelia Grey (m. 1851)
- Father: William C. Goodridge

Glenalvin J. Goodridge (c. 1829 – November 14, 1867) was an American photographer from York, Pennsylvania. He was among the first African-American photographers. In 1863, Goodridge was convicted of a rape charge and spent a year in prison until receiving a gubernatorial pardon the next year. He then moved to Minneapolis where he died of tuberculosis in 1867. In 2021, many of Goodridge's daguerreotypes joined the collection of the Smithsonian American Art Museum.

== Early life and career ==
Goodridge was born in York, Pennsylvania, the first son of William C. Goodridge, an ex-slave. He married his wife, Rhoda Cornelia Grey, on June 10, 1851, and their son Glen J. Goodridge was born in 1860.

From 1847 to 1851, Goodridge was primarily a teacher at the "Colored High School" in York, a role he continued part-time thereafter. Nationally known abolitionist Frances Harper taught at the same school beginning in 1864.

With his brothers, Wallace Goodridge and William O. Goodridge, he operated a photo studio in York, and later in East Saginaw, Michigan. The Saginaw studio was closed by Wallace in 1922.

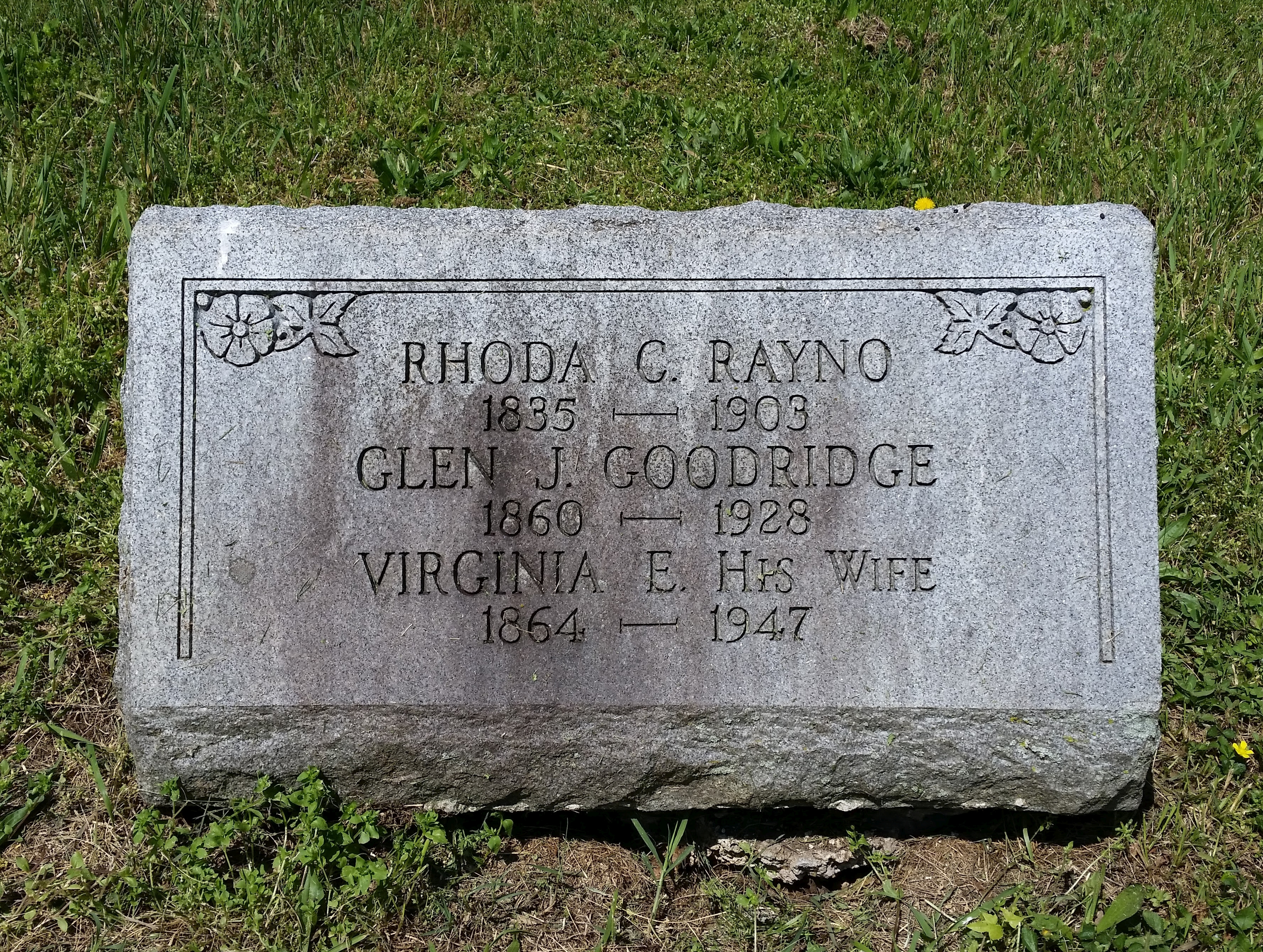
Goodridge's wife, who remarried, and son Glen are buried in Lebanon Cemetery, in North York.

== Incarceration and later years ==
From 1863 to 1864, Goodridge was incarcerated in the Eastern State Penitentiary after being convicted on a charge of rape. Following a campaign by his father, Pennsylvania governor Andrew G. Curtin pardoned Goodridge. While incarcerated, he contracted tuberculosis, which led to his death in Minneapolis on November 14, 1867. Goodridge is buried at the Minneapolis Pioneers and Soldiers Memorial Cemetery.

== Legacy ==
In 2018, a reproduction of the photo studio he operated with his brothers, Wallace and William O., opened within the Goodridge Freedom Center in York, Pennsylvania. In 2021, many of his daguerreotypes were acquired for the collection of the Smithsonian American Art Museum.
