= Christiana Riot =

1851 armed resistance by free Blacks and escaped slaves

- Christiana Resistance; Part of origins of the American Civil War
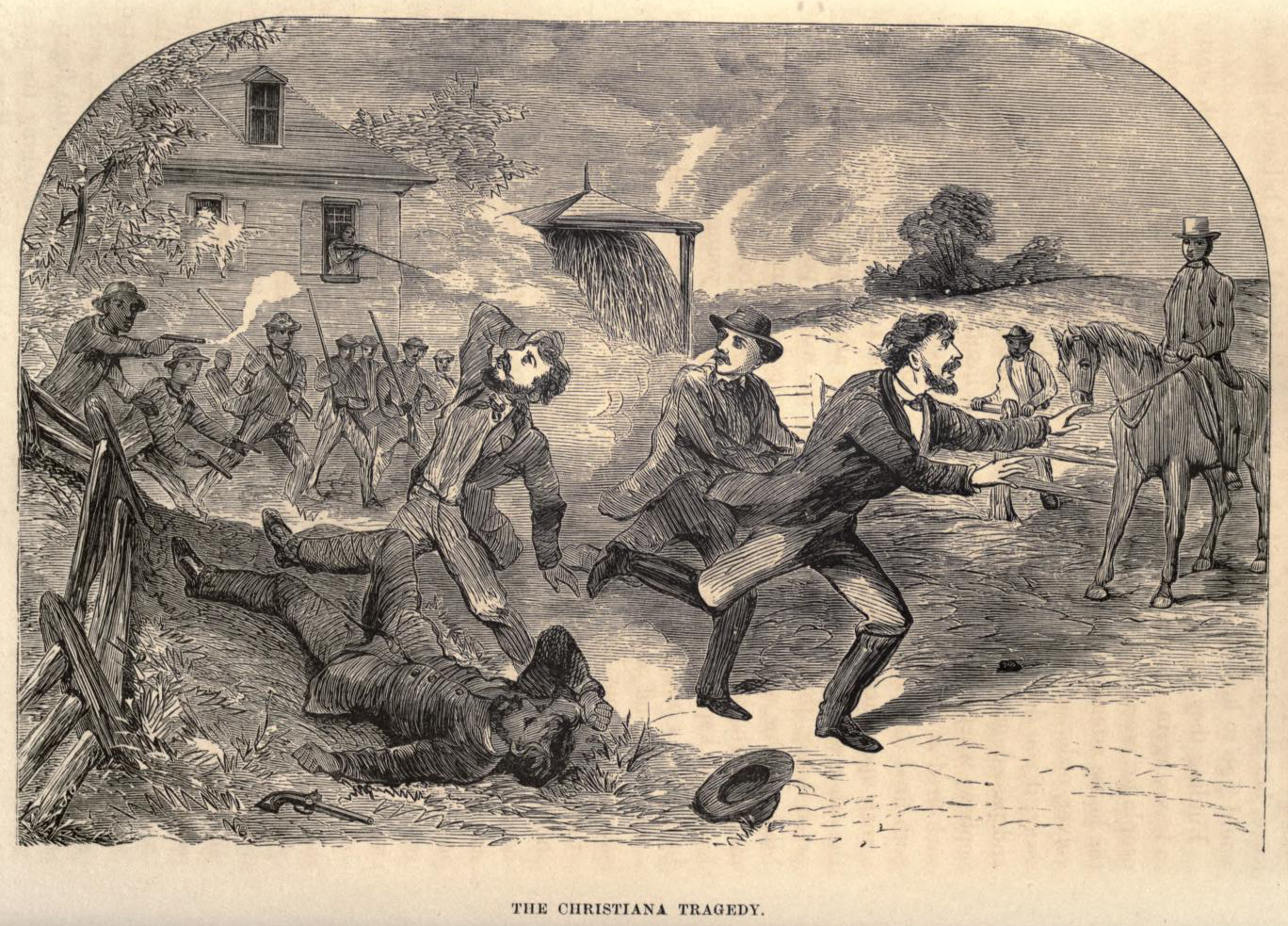
- "The Christiana Tragedy", an 1872 depiction of the shooting of Edward Gorsuch.
- Date: September 11, 1851
- Location: Christiana, Pennsylvania, Lancaster County, Pennsylvania, U.S. 39°56′10″N 76°00′45″W
- Result: Armed resistance successful; Edward Gorsuch killed; Escaped slaves and others flee to Canada

Parties
Free Blacks and escaped slaves	Slavecatchers, federal marshals

Lead figures
William Parker	Edward Gorsuch †

Casualties and losses
Several wounded	Gorsuch killed, others wounded
- Many indicted for treason; an event leading to American Civil War

The Christiana Resistance, also known as Christiana incident, or Christiana riot, was the successful armed resistance by free Black people and escaped slaves to a raid led by a federal marshal to recover four escaped slaves owned by Edward Gorsuch of Maryland. The raid took place in the early morning of September 11, 1851, at the house in Christiana, Pennsylvania, of William Parker, himself an escaped slave. This took place after the federal Fugitive Slave Act of 1850 increased penalties for assisting escaped slaves and required state government officials, even in free states such as Pennsylvania, to assist in the recapture of slaves.

The confrontation resulted in an exchange of gunfire, the death of Edward Gorsuch, and the dispersal of the raiders. In the aftermath, many of the Black people involved quickly traveled to the safety of Canada. In total, 41 people, Black and White, were indicted by the federal government for treason. Castner Hanway, a white man from Christiana, was the first to be tried, beginning in November 1851. After only 15 minutes of deliberation by the jury, he was acquitted, and charges against the remaining defendants were dropped. The issue became a national lightning rod and aroused strong sectional sentiment. It was one of many events leading to the American Civil War.

== Background ==
In the years before the abolition of slavery in the United States, slave-owners of the South pushed for increased federal and state government support for the recovery of escaped slaves. However, in the free states of the North, many residents and governments had resisted, especially given that in the free states, many individuals or even state laws protected fleeing slaves.

Congress passed the Fugitive Slave Act of 1850, which permitted slave owners or their agents to pursue fugitive slaves in free states and required state officials to aid in the recapture of the alleged slaves. Those aiding an escaping slave could face six months' imprisonment and a $1,000 fine.

In 1849, Edward Gorsuch, who farmed in Monkton, Maryland, owned twelve slaves. He considered himself a "good" slaveholder, freeing some of his slaves at the age of 28 and offering them paid seasonal work after that. With changes in crops and other conditions, slavery was no longer as necessary in Maryland, and there was a relatively high proportion of free black people. Gorsuch did not sell his excess slaves to the Deep South as many other Maryland slave owners of the time did. Five bushels of wheat went missing, and Gorsuch was told that some of his slaves had stolen it. Four of his older male slaves, Noah Buley, Nelson Ford, George Hammond, and Joshua Hammond, fled north to Pennsylvania, a free state. Gorsuch believed that they had been enticed away and would willingly return if he only talked to them.

Christiana, in Lancaster County, Pennsylvania, is 20 miles (32 km) north of the border with Maryland and had become a refuge for fugitive slaves. It was also an area of settlement by numerous free Black people. This area was frequently raided by slave catchers trying to capture refugee slaves. For two decades, local Black people had organized for self-protection, at times preventing such capture or even rescuing slaves who had been captured. Others chose to flee to Canada. The leader of the resistance in 1851 was William Parker, an escaped slave about 29 years old.

In Philadelphia, where warrants for the arrest of fugitive slaves in Pennsylvania were usually acquired at the federal court after the 1850 act was passed, another group, the Special Secret Committee, had organized to gather information and warn those being hunted.

== Incident ==
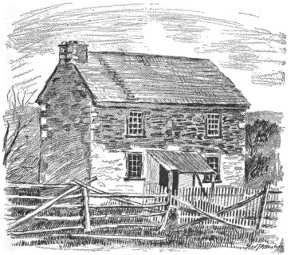
Line drawing of William Parker's house, circa 1851.

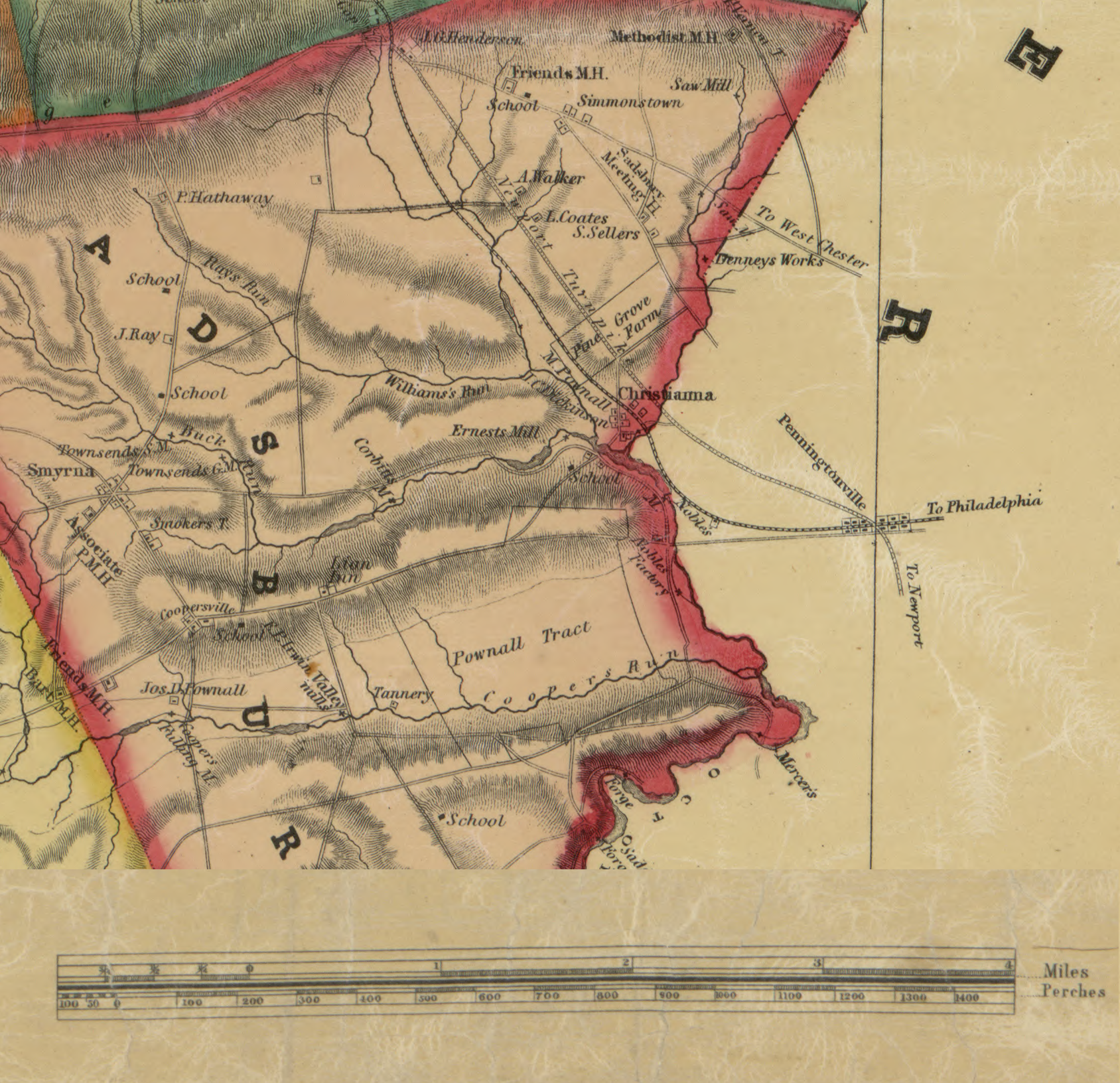
1851 map of the area. Note Penningtonville station to the east in Chester County, Christiana itself, and the Pownall tract to the southwest of Christiana, where the Parker house was located (in the western portion).

Edward Gorsuch heard that his four escaped slaves had taken refuge in Lancaster County. On September 9, 1851, in Philadelphia, he obtained a federal warrant under the Fugitive Slave Act for the arrest of George Hammond, Joshua Hammond, Nelson Ford, and Noah Buley. Henry Kline, a deputy Federal Marshall, was authorized to make the arrests. Gorsuch hired John Agan and Thompson Tully, Philadelphia police officers, to assist in the arrest. These three were to meet with Gorsuch and some additional men at Penningtonville (now Atglen,) a station on the Philadelphia and Columbia Railroad.

From Philadelphia, the group had been watched by Samuel Williams, a member of the Special Secret Committee; he followed Kline and warned the Black community around Christiana that they were coming. Kline, Agan, and Tully were aware that Williams was following them and knew that secrecy was gone; Agan and Tully returned to Philadelphia because of the risk of violence. Kline had been delayed from the Penningtonville meeting and eventually tracked down the Gorsuch party on the morning of September 10 in Sadsbury. The party entering Christiana was Henry Kline, Edward Gorsuch, his son Dickinson Gorsuch, his nephew Joshua M. Gorsuch, his nephew Dr. Thomas Pearce, Nicholas T. Hutchings, and Nathan Nelson.

Shortly after midnight on September 11, the Gorsuch party set out on the raid with a hired, disguised white guide. The first house he took them to supposedly had one of the slaves, but they decided to go to another place where two were staying before returning to the first. Gorsuch believed that if he had captured two of the slaves, the third, whose wife he still held enslaved, could be persuaded to return. Just before dawn, the group reached William Parker's house, where the guide had said two slaves were staying. The guide left. It is unknown whether the guide had deliberately led them to the center of resistance in Lancaster County.

William Parker knew the group was hunting slaves. Also in his house were his wife, Eliza; her sister, Hannah; Hannah's husband, Alexander Pinckney; and Abraham Johnson. Two visitors were also there: Joshua Kite, also known as John Beard, who was one of Gorsuch's escaped slaves, probably Nelson Ford; and Samuel Thompson, another of the escaped slaves who had taken a new name. Sarah Pownall, a white neighbor and wife of Parker's landlord, stopped by the evening of September 10 to warn that if the raiders came, all of the blacks should flee to Canada.

As the raiders traveled up to Parker's house, which was on a hill, they ran into Joshua Kite, possibly returning home or possibly acting as a lookout, and Gorsuch recognized him as one of the escaped slaves. Kite recognized his former owner and rushed back to the house, yelling a warning. Accounts of events over the next two hours are contradictory. Parker and his household moved to the second floor with their guns and were in a good position to defend themselves.

The Kline and Gorsuch party surrounded the house, and Kline, the deputy US Marshal, announced their legal authority to seize Nelson Ford. Parker and his household refused to give up Ford, with some debate. Eliza Parker blew the horn to signal to local Blacks that help was needed. Shots were fired, either first by the posse at Eliza Parker, or first by the household at Gorsuch when he attempted to enter the house; no one was seriously injured at this time. Dickinson Gorsuch and Kline recommended retreat to recruit a larger force; Edward Gorsuch refused. The household asked for time. They discussed whether the two refugee slaves should surrender.

Parker may have been delaying so reinforcements could arrive. Numerous armed men arrived, including Noah Buley, another of Gorsuch's escaped slaves. Also arriving were several neighboring whites, including Elijah Lewis, a local shopkeeper on foot, and Castner Hanway, a local miller on horseback. Gorsuch assumed the white men, although unarmed, were leaders of the estimated 75 to 150 Black people, many with guns, who arrived over the next 30 minutes. Kline believed the white men would join his party in carrying out the law. He identified himself as a US Marshal and talked with them; Hanway refused to help him to arrest anyone. Hanway apparently told Kline and his group to leave before blood was shed. According to Lewis, Hanway begged the Black people not to shoot.

Kline apparently warned Hanway and Lewis that they were committing a federal crime by not assisting him. When Edward Gorsuch confronted his slave, Samuel Thompson, the man clubbed him. Gorsuch fell and was fatally shot multiple times. His son (Dickinson) went to his aid but was also shot multiple times. He was able to move away and was aided by a white man: either Joseph Scarlett (according to Dickinson) or Levi Pownall (according to Parker). Dickinson was taken to the nearby Pownall house, where, although initially expected to die, he survived. Lewis left as soon as the violence started, as did Kline, who joined up with Nicholas Hutchins and followed Lewis.

Joshua Gorsuch and Thomas Pearce fled when they realized that Edward Gorsuch was being attacked. They were sheltered by Hanway on his horse, but he was also trying to flee. He left at a gallop. Joshua Gorsuch and Thomas Pearce continued to flee; they were shot and seriously injured but either escaped (or were released) and survived.

== Immediate aftermath ==
Parker, Gorsuch's former slaves, and some other Black people fled north to the eventual safety of Canada. In Rochester, New York, where he was to take a boat to Canada, Parker took refuge in the house of Frederick Douglass. He had known him when both were slaves in Maryland. Douglass arranged for the group to catch the ferry to Canada. The Christiana Resistance had been the latest in a series of confrontations over fugitive slaves, following on the heels of several high-profile cases in Boston, including the escape of Shadrach Minkins from custody in February 1851. The Federal government had been stymied in its efforts to enforce those cases and was becoming harsher to create a deterrent.

In the case of the re-enslavement of Thomas Sims in April, federal marshals and army soldiers had been used to keep order. However, these previous incidents had been without white deaths. The death of the slave owner in the Christiana resistance led President Fillmore to call out the Marines. They searched the area and eventually arrested 36 black and five white people. The federal government, wishing to set an example, charged them with the severe offense of treason. Fillmore's actions were somewhat pragmatic: the issue aroused strong sentiments in the South, and Southerners called for the rioters to be hanged or else the South might secede. It received national press coverage. Northerners were also agitated, as – according to them – it demonstrated the reach of the Slave Power and especially the Fugitive Slave Act into the otherwise free North.

== Legal proceedings ==
On October 6, 1851, indictments for the first 38 people listed below were remitted from the District Court to the Circuit Court. On November 14, 1851, the Grand Jury of the United States District Court, Philadelphia returned true bills of indictment against 41 people. Parker and some others were charged in absentia.

Of the 41 men charged (ordered as on the indictment), except where noted, 36 were Black:

1. Castner Hanway, White, miller, trial started November 24, 1851.
2. Joseph Scarlett, White, farmer
3. Elijah Lewis, White, storekeeper in Cooperville
4. James Jackson, White, farmer
5. George Williams
6. Jacob Moore
7. George Reed
8. Benjamin Johnson
9. Daniel Caulsberry
10. Alson Pernsley
11. William Brown, 2nd
12. Henry Green
13. Elijah Clark
14. John Holliday
15. William Williams
16. Benjamin Pindergast
17. John Morgan
18. Ezekiel Thompson
19. Thomas Butler
20. Collister Wilson
21. John Jackson
22. William Brown
23. Isaiah Clarkson
24. Henry Simms
25. Charles Hunter
26. Lewis Gates
27. Peter Woods
28. Lewis Clarkson
29. Nelson Carter
30. William Parker (had already fled to Canada)
31. John Berry
32. William Berry
33. Samuel Williams was tried in the Federal District Court for "interfering with the execution of warrants for the arrest of Noah Buley and Joshua Hammond, runaway slaves"; he was found "not guilty" on February 4, 1852.
34. Josh Hammond, one of Gorsuch's escaped slaves
35. Henry Curtis
36. Washington Williams
37. William Thomas
38. Nelson Ford, one of Gorsuch's escaped slaves
39. George Hammond, one of Gorsuch's escaped slaves
40. Noah Buley, one of Gorsuch's escaped slaves
41. Jacob R Townsend, White, merchant, was charged with giving a loaded weapon to fugitive slave John Roberts, who was headed to the William Parker home.

=== United States vs. Castner Hanway ===
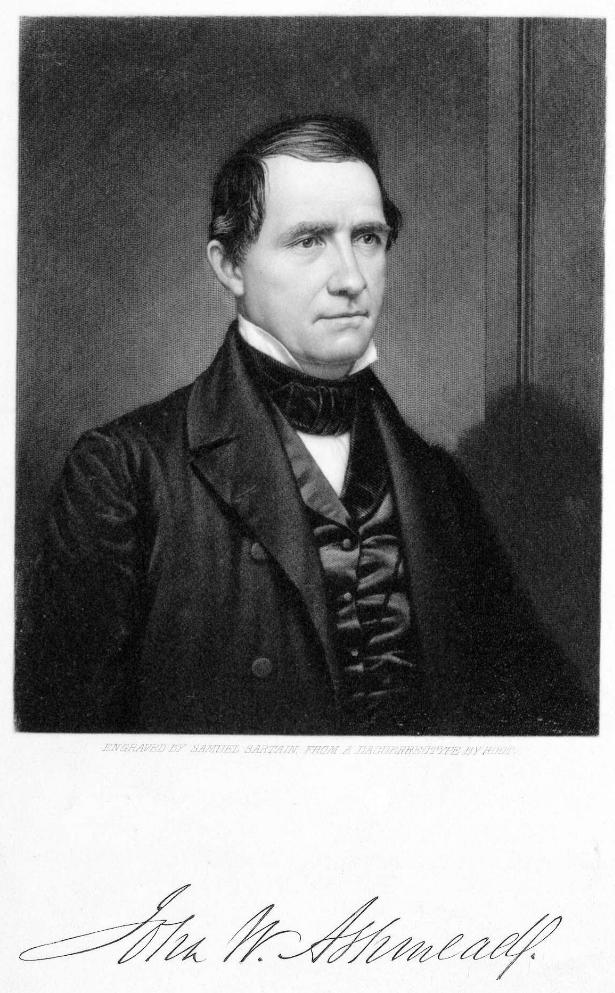
John W. Ashmead, United States District Attorney, in the case of the United States vs. Caster Hanway

Castner Hanway (sometimes spelled Hanaway), one of the five white men charged and alleged to be a ringleader, was the first to be tried. His trial at the US Courthouse in Philadelphia lasted from November 24 until December 11, 1851. Supreme Court Justice Robert C. Grier and U.S. District Court Judge John K. Kane presided. The prosecution was headed by John W. Ashmead of the US Attorney's office, who was joined by lawyers from Maryland. Thaddeus Stevens headed the defense team. Theodore Cuyler made the opening speech for the defense.

Hanway was acquitted by the jury after 15 minutes of deliberation. The prosecutor then withdrew the other charges, as it was apparent that the charge of treason could hardly be satisfied. The defense pointed out the absurdity of trying a group of poorly armed Quaker farmers for somehow levying war against the United States.

== Fate of those involved ==
William Parker was joined in Canada by Eliza, his wife, in November 1851, and eventually, their children. They settled in Buxton, Ontario. He died sometime before 1881, and Eliza died in May 1899. Some of their descendants still live in Canada.

Castner Hanway moved in 1878 to Wilber, Nebraska, and died there in 1893.

== Historical markers ==
In September 1911, a dedication ceremony for a memorial to the incident in Christiana took place with descendants of both sides and of Peter Woods, one of those indicted, present. Memorial medals were cast. The first, representing "Law", had a portrait of Millard Fillmore, president when the Fugitive Slave Act was passed, on one side and engraved on the other, "In memory of Edward Gorsuch, Commemoration of the Christiana Riot and Treason Trials. 1851 – September 11 – 1911"; it was given to a granddaughter of Edward Gorsuch. The other, representing "Liberty", had a portrait of Abraham Lincoln on one side and engraved on the other with "Peter Woods, Freeman, Soldier, Citizen. Sole survivor of the Christiana Riot and Treason Trials. 1851 – September 11 – 1911"; this was given to Peter Woods.

In 1998, a historical marker for the Christiana Resistance was placed in Lancaster. It is one of several historical markers in Lancaster County that mark significant events related to the Underground Railroad. Another historical marker is at Gorsuch Tavern in Glencoe, Maryland, on the York road, where Edward Gorsuch and some of his relatives and friends met to plan the raid.
