= Karina Goodridge =

Barbadian politician

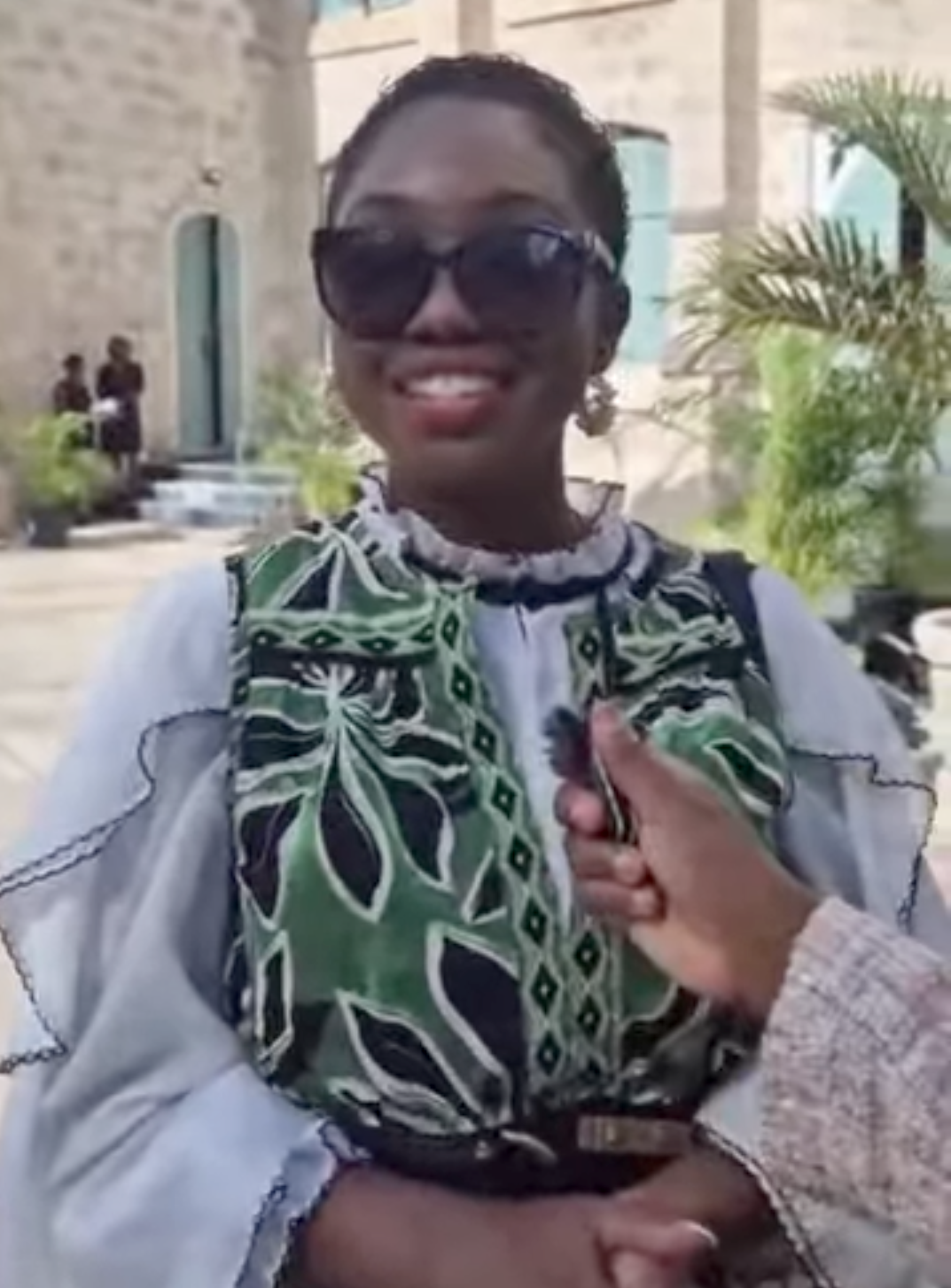
- Arriving at the first session of Parliament in 2026

Leader of Friends of Democracy
- Incumbent
- Assumed office 18 May 2025

Member of the Senate of Barbados
- Incumbent
- Assumed office 20 February 2026
- Prime Minister: Mia Mottley

Personal details
- Party: Friends of Democracy

Karina Goodridge is a Barbadian politician from Friends of Democracy who is an opposition member of the Senate of Barbados.

She was an unsuccessful candidate for the House of Assembly of Barbados in the Saint Philip West constituency at the 2026 Barbadian general election.
