= Lawrence Goodridge =

Canadian food scientist

- Born: Hamilton, Ontario, Canada
- Education: University of Guelph
- Scientific career
- Fields: Food science
- Workplaces: McGill University, University of Guelph

External videos
- Interview with Lawrence Goodridge, Food Safety News, August 9, 2015
- Tales from the john: Here's a place where Covid can't hide, Toronto Sun, January 14, 2022

Lawrence Goodridge is a Canadian food scientist. He is the Canada Research Chair in Foodborne Pathogen Dynamics at the University of Guelph and Director of Guelph's Canadian Research Institute for Food Safety. Goodridge studies detection of and protection from food- and water-borne pathogens such as Escherichia coli, Salmonella and Listeria. He uses wastewater testing to study the spread of COVID-19 and other diseases.

== Early life and education ==
Goodridge was born in Hamilton, Ontario, Canada. He attended the University of Guelph, receiving his B.Sc. in microbiology in 1995, his M.Sc. in Food Microbiology in 1997, and his Ph.D. in Food Microbiology in 2002. He studied food safety at the Canadian Research Institute for food safety in 2003. He then held a post-doctoral fellowship at the University of Georgia where he worked with Michael P. Doyle.

== Career ==
In 2003, Goodridge joined the faculty at the University of Wyoming. In 2006, he moved to Colorado State University.

In 2013, Goodridge became an Associate Professor and the Ian and Jayne Munro Chair in Food Safety in the Department of Food Science and Agricultural Chemistry at McGill University.

In January 2019 Goodridge became the Leung Family Professor of Food Safety at the University of Guelph, where he also holds the position of Director of Guelph's Canadian Research Institute for Food Safety. In 2024, Goodridge was awarded the Canada Research Chair in Foodborne Pathogen Dynamics

== Research ==
Goodridge has studied Salmonella and led a $10-million research project with the goal of mapping the genomes of all known Salmonella varieties. This would help scientists to better understand why only 20-25 of the known 2,500 serotypes of Salmonella normally cause human disease. He is developing predictive models of the virulence of foodborne pathogens, using phenotypic and genotypic methods.

Goodridge has warned that the incidence of food-related illnesses is increasing as temperatures rise and more extreme weather events occur due to climate change. He also reports that the Canadian Food Inspection Agency is using whole genome sequencing to identify and track the sources of contaminated food and to increase the safety of the Canadian food supply.

Goodridge uses wastewater testing as a community-level indicator for monitoring the spread of COVID-19 and other diseases. He combines data from wastewater analysis with social media syndromic analysis, which studies the social media usage of those who report online that they feel ill. Goodridge currently co-directs the $15-million INSPIRE project, which aims to further expand the use of wastewater surveillance to build resiliency into the Canadian biomanufacturing supply chain in preparation for the next pandemic.
