= Emily Goodridge Grey =

American abolitionist (1834–1916)

Emily O. Goodridge Grey (~1834 – 1916) was an early Black settler and abolitionist who lived in St. Anthony, Minnesota. She is most well known for her role in the freedom case of Eliza Winston. She was the daughter of William Goodridge, a prominent abolitionist and conductor on the Underground Railroad.

== Biography ==
Grey was born in Pennsylvania to abolitionist parents. Her father was formerly enslaved, and had won his freedom in 1821. He worked as a barber, was a newspaper distributor, helped to build Centre Hall, and was involved in railroading. Her father also helped freedom seekers escape their masters, openly from his home in York.

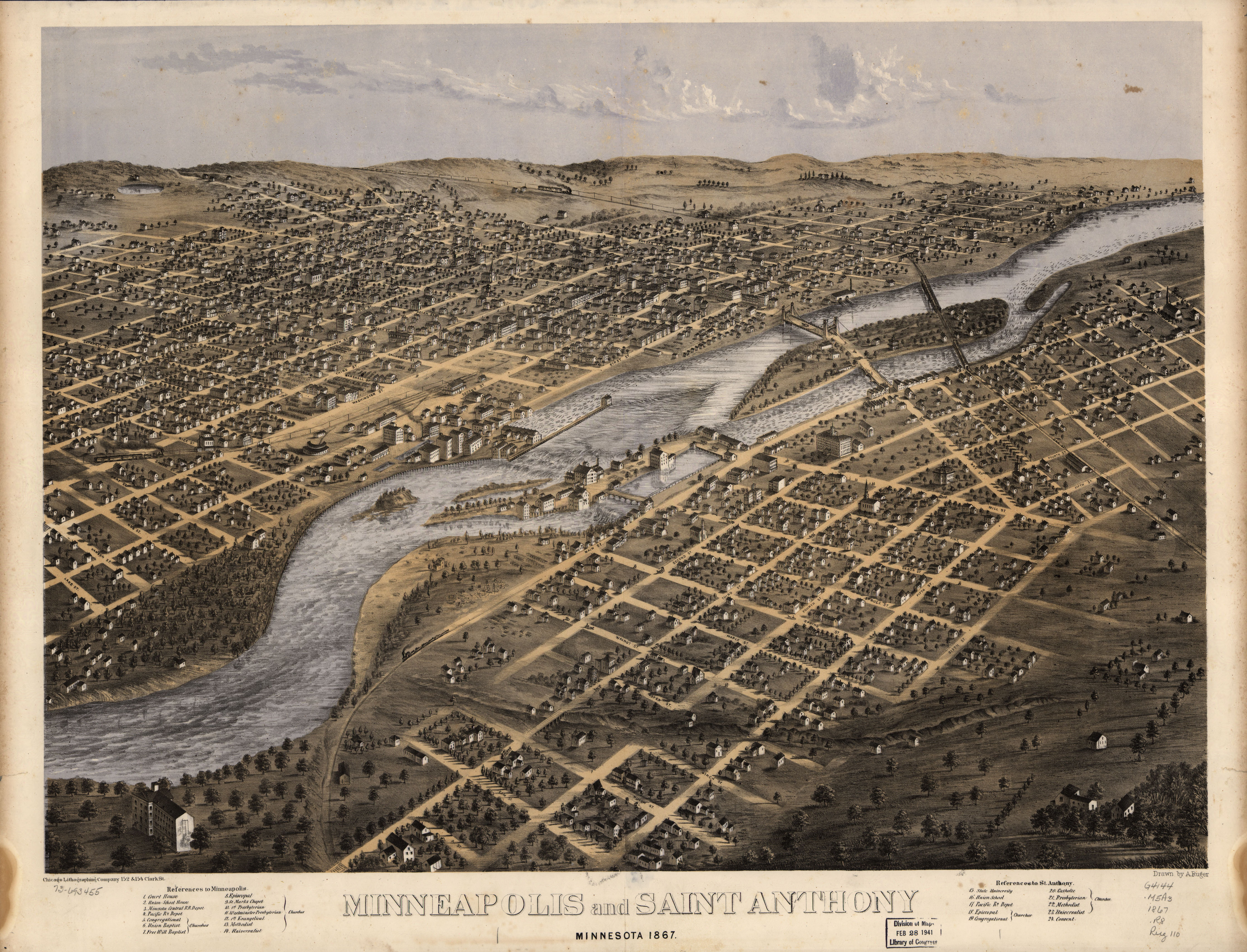
Minneapolis and Saint Anthony in 1867.

Grey settled in Old St. Anthony with her husband Ralph Toyer Grey, whom she married in 1855. Ralph was a barber, well-educated, and a skilled public speaker. Barbers held an important role in free Black communities, as they offered both economic mobility and served as a social hub for the local Black (and often abolitionist) communities. He moved to St. Anthony to start a barbershop in 1855 and Emily followed him in 1857 with their son William, traveling by rail, steamboat, and stagecoach.

Grey ran her own business as a seamstress. She was a member of St. Anthony's First Congregational Church, where Reverend Charles Secombe preached against slavery. The Grey family were part of a small Black community who moved to St. Anthony around the same time, with eight families moving to the area in 1857.

Grey was the abolitionist whom which Eliza Winston connected with in 1861. Grey worked with local abolitionists, such as W.D. Babbit, Ariel S. Bigelow, and William S. King, to free Winston. On August 21, Grey, Babbit, and Grey's white friend Mrs. Gates, filed a complaint which asserted that Winston was being "restrained of her liberty by her master." They, along with the Hennepin County Sheriff, delivered a writ of habeas corpus to where Winston was staying on Lake Harriet with her enslavers. Grey stayed with Winston as Winston testified in court. A mob damaged the Grey family home following the court's ruling in favor of Winston's freedom.

Grey's husband, Ralph, was involved in promoting an amendment to the Minnesota constitution extending suffrage to Black men, which was ratified in 1869. Ralph read the Emancipation Proclamation at the Convention of Colored Citizens in celebration. He was also involved with the Pride of Minnesota Lodge No. 1 (Crispus Attucks) of the Knights of Pythias. The Greys were friends with Ida Wells and Frederick Douglass, the latter of whom who stayed with them when speaking in Minnesota in 1873.

The Greys had three more children: Toussaint L'Ouverture Grey, the first Black child born in St. Anthony who was named after the Black Haitian general, Harriet Martineau Grey named after the British abolitionist, and Ralph Banneker Grey, in honor of Benjamin Bannecker who helped plot out Washington D.C..

Grey also led a campaign for an exhibit promoting the achievements of Black women at the 1893 World's Columbian Exposition in Chicago, but organizers refused. She was also involved with local organizations such as the Territorial Pioneers and the St. Thomas Episcopal Church Mission. She wrote a brief memoir of her experience in territorial Minnesota in 1893.

Grey died in Minneapolis on January 16, 1916, at age eighty-two.
