= Christiana, Pennsylvania =

Borough in Pennsylvania, US

- Borough
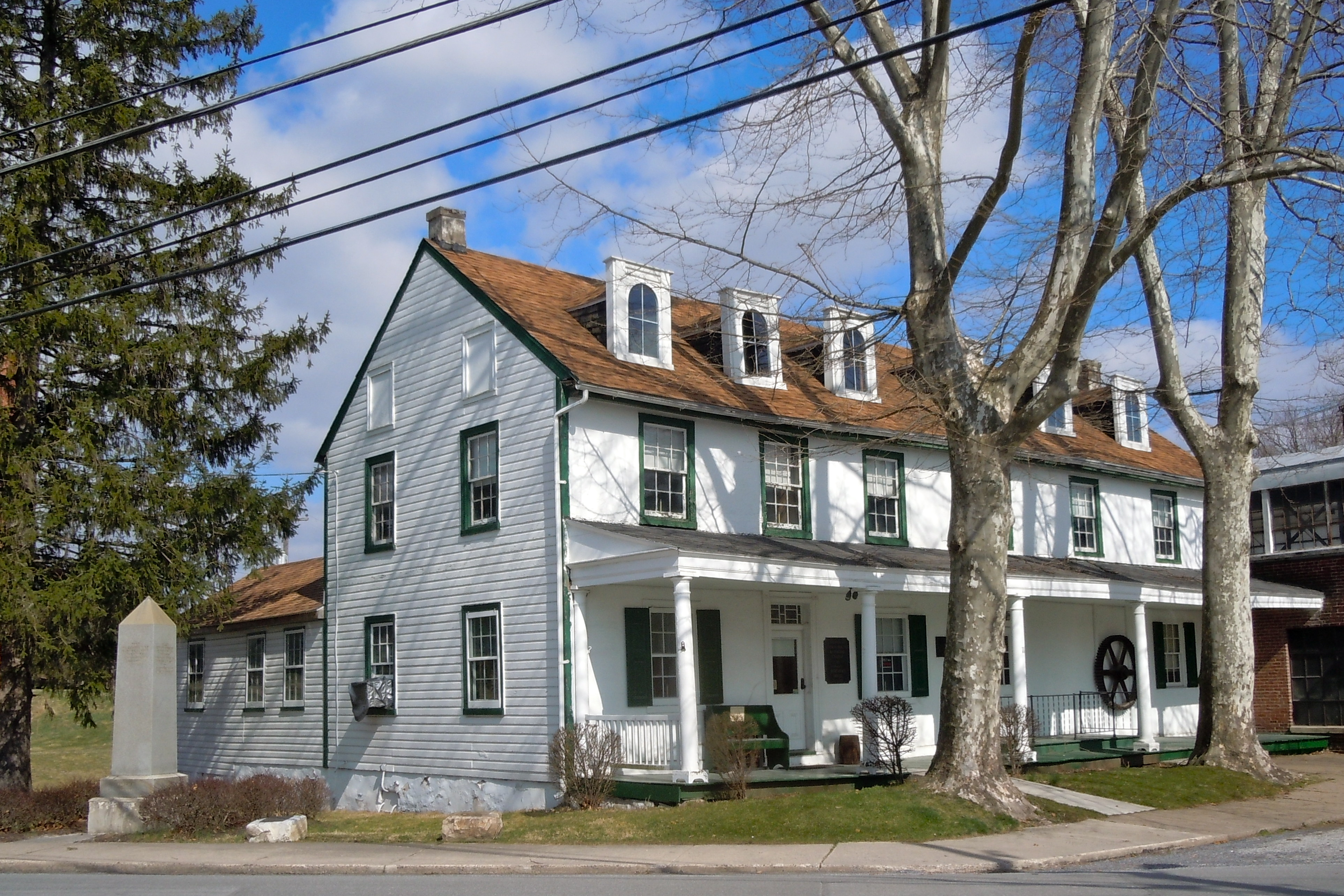
- Zercher Hotel

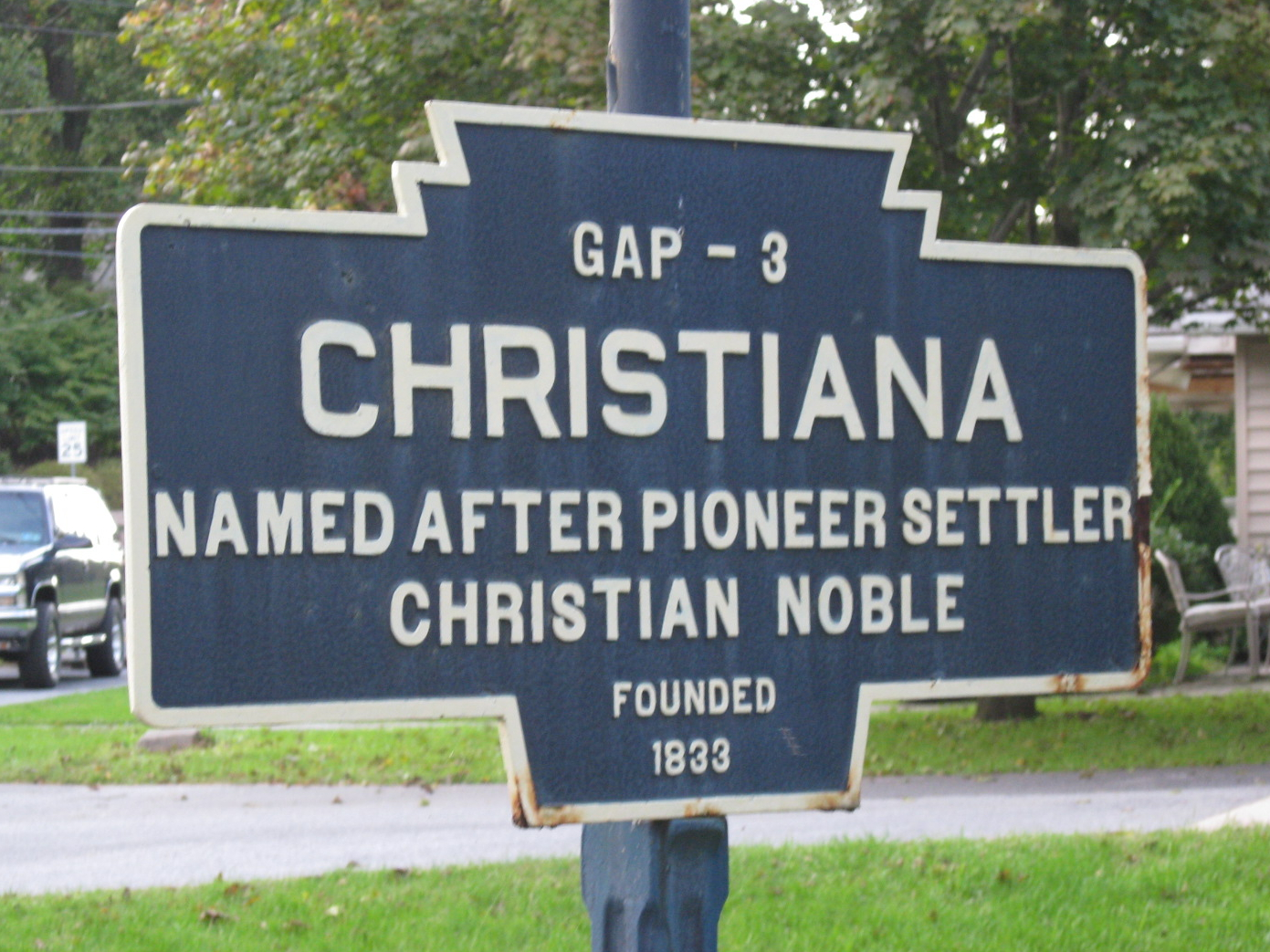
- Keystone Marker

- Location in Lancaster County, Pennsylvania

- Location in Pennsylvania Location in the United States
- Coordinates: 39°57′19″N 75°59′46″W
- Country: United States
- State: Pennsylvania
- County: Lancaster
- Incorporated: 1894
- Named for: Christiana Noble

Area
  - Total: 0.53 sq mi (1.37 km^{2})
  - Land: 0.53 sq mi (1.37 km^{2})
  - Water: 0.0039 sq mi (0.01 km^{2})
- Elevation: 489 ft (149 m)

Population (2020)
  - Total: 1,112
  - Density: 2,109.0/sq mi (814.29/km^{2})
- Time zone: UTC-5 (EST)
  - Summer (DST): UTC-4 (EDT)
- ZIP Code: 17509
- Area code: 610
- FIPS code: 42-13512
- Website: christianaboro.org

Christiana is a borough in Lancaster County, Pennsylvania, United States. The population was 1,100 at the time of the 2020 census.

In 1851, it was the site of the Battle of Christiana, also called the Christiana riot.

== History ==
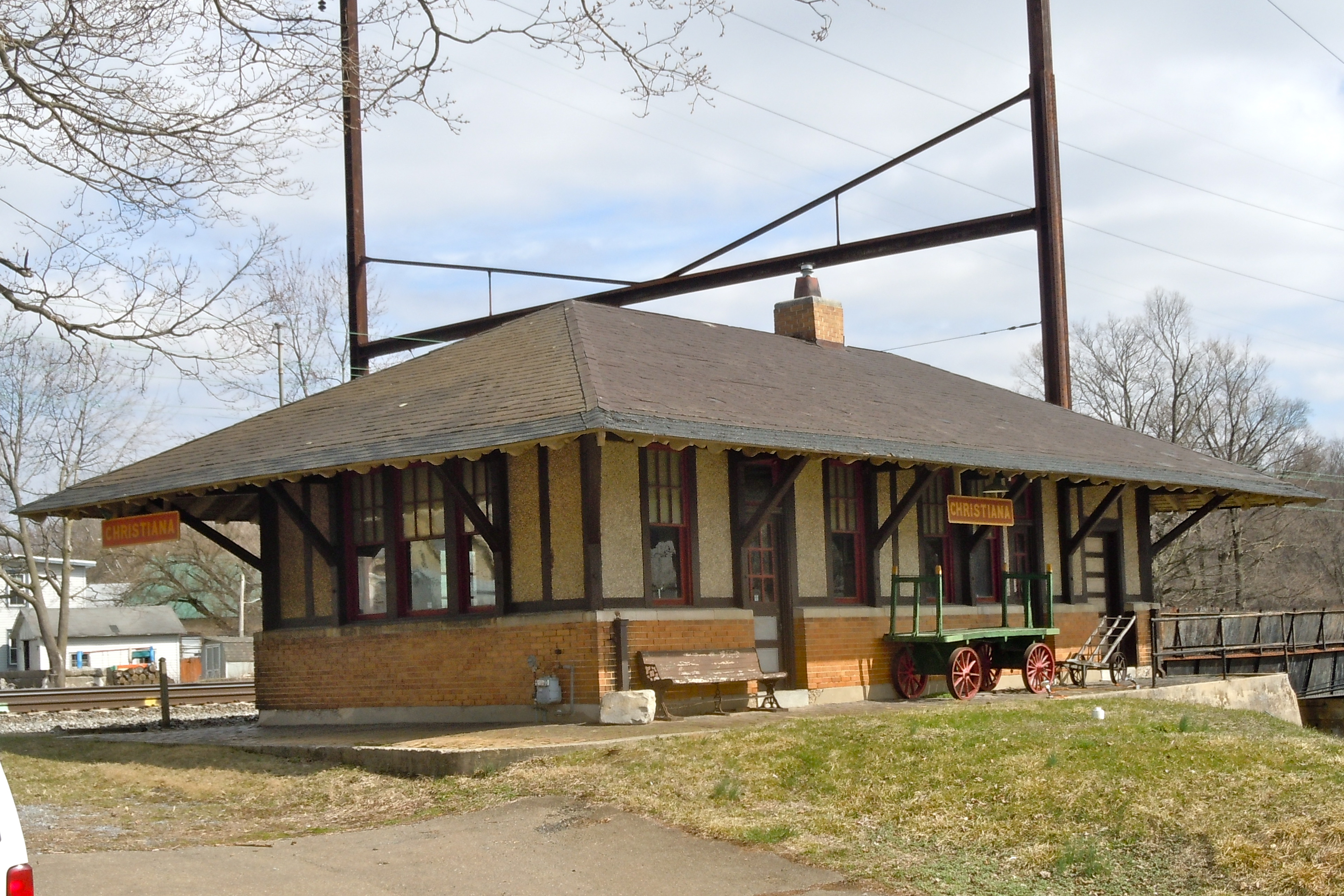
The Christiana railroad depot constructed by the Pennsylvania Railroad

Present-day Christiana was once known as Nobleville. The current name honors Christiana Noble, the wife of one of the first settlers.

On September 11, 1851, Christiana was the site of the Battle of Christiana (also called the Christiana Riot), in which the local residents defended with firearms a fugitive slave, killing the slaveowner. Southerners demanded the hanging of those responsible, accusing them of treason and waging war against the United States. However, after the first defendant was acquitted, the government dropped the case.

The trial was the first nationally covered challenge to the Fugitive Slave Act of 1850.

== Geography ==
Christiana is located in eastern Lancaster County at 39°57′19″N 75°59′46″W (39.955262, -75.996208).

It is bordered to the north, west, and south by Sadsbury Township and to the east by West Sadsbury Township in Chester County.

Pennsylvania Route 372 passes through the center of the borough, leading east 5 miles (8 km) to Parkesburg and west 11 miles (18 km) to Quarryville. Lancaster is 19 miles (31 km) to the northwest via Pennsylvania Route 41, and U.S. Route 30.

According to the U.S. Census Bureau, the borough has a total area of 0.53 square miles (1.37 km^{2}), all land.

The borough is in the valley of Pine Creek, which forms the Lancaster County/Chester County line, and which flows south to form Octoraro Creek, a southward-flowing tributary of the Susquehanna River.

== Demographics ==
Historical population
Census	Pop.	Note	%±
1880	469		—
1900	828		—
1910	934		12.8%
1920	985		5.5%
1930	959		−2.6%
1940	1,062		10.7%
1950	1,043		−1.8%
1960	1,069		2.5%
1970	1,131		5.8%
1980	1,183		4.6%
1990	1,045		−11.7%
2000	1,124		7.6%
2010	1,168		3.9%
2020	1,112		−4.8%
2021 (est.)	1,094	▼	−1.6%

Christiana is the least populous borough in Lancaster County.

As of the 2000 census, there were 1,124 people, 383 households, and 284 families residing in the borough.

The population density was 2,121.6 inhabitants per square mile (819.2/km^{2}). There were 391 housing units at an average density of 738.0 units per square mile (284.9 units/km^{2}).

The racial makeup of the borough was 96.09% White, 1.87% Black or African American, 0.18% Native American, 0.27% from other races, and 1.60% from two or more races. 4.00% of the population were Hispanic or Latino of any race.

There were 383 households, out of which 33.2% had children under the age of eighteen living with them; 58.7% were married couples living together, 11.5% had a female householder with no husband present, and 25.6% were non-families. 22.2% of all households were made up of individuals, and 9.1% had someone living alone who was sixty-five years of age or older.

The average household size was 2.55 and the average family size was 3.00.

In the borough, the population was spread out, with 22.8% under the age of eighteen, 7.3% from eighteen to twenty-four, 26.8% from twenty-five to forty-four, 20.3% from forty-five to sixty-four, and 22.9% who were sixty-five years of age or older. The median age was forty years.

For every one hundred females, there were 85.2 males. For every one hundred females who were aged eighteen or older, there were 78.2 males.

The median income for a household in the borough was $48,333, and the median income for a family was $50,583. Males had a median income of $35,125 compared with that of $25,000 for females.

The per capita income for the borough was $18,764.

Roughly 3.8% of families and 6.3% of the population were living below the poverty line, including 13.5% of those who were under the age of eighteen and 1.6% of those who were aged sixty-five or older.

== Education ==
The borough is served by the Octorara Area School District.

== Notable people ==
- David Hayes Agnew, surgeon and medical professor
- William Walton Griest, former U.S. Congressman
- Jonathan Groff, Tony and Grammy award winning actor and singer
