= Minneapolis Pioneers and Soldiers Memorial Cemetery =

- U.S. National Register of Historic Places
- Minneapolis Landmark
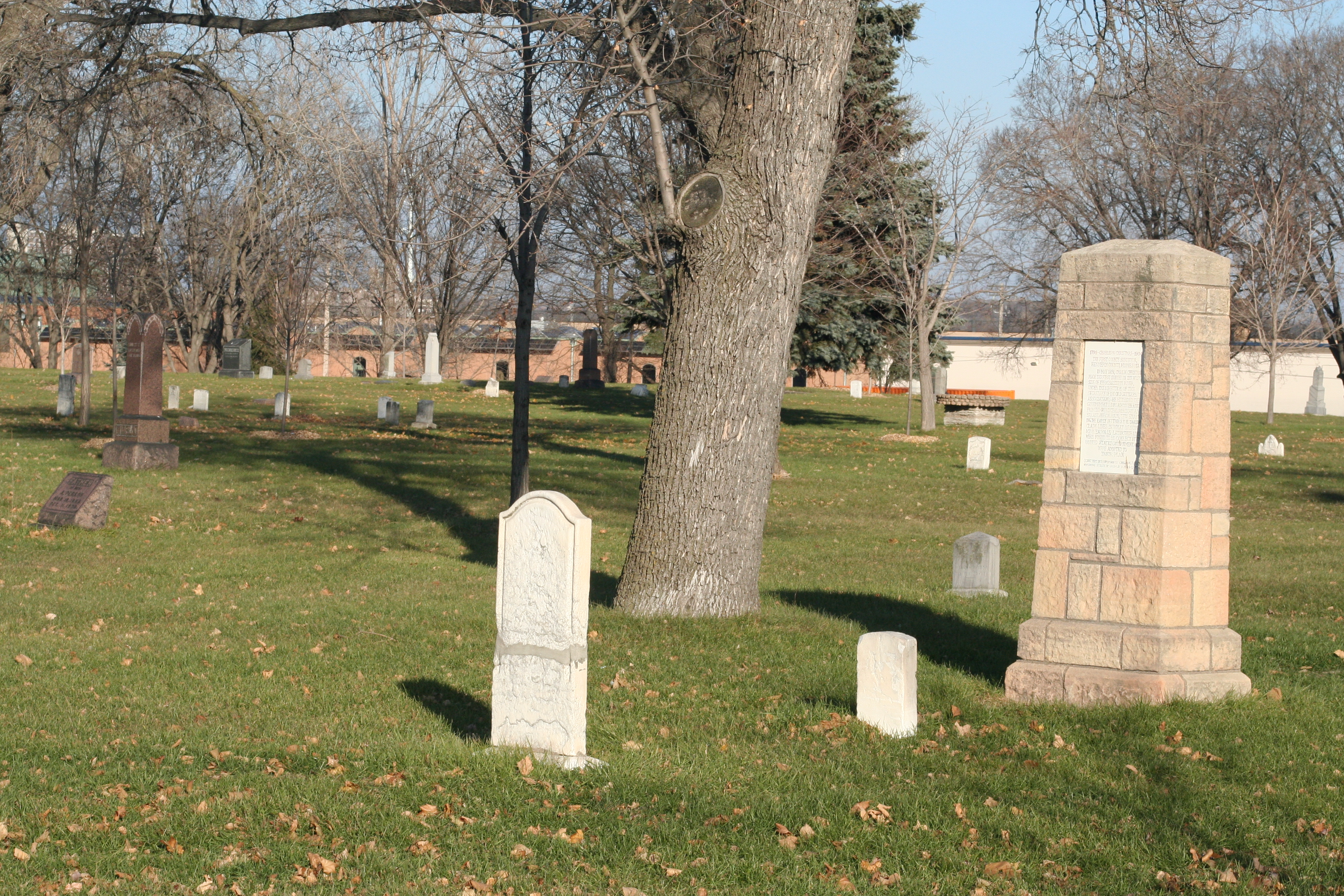
- Grave markers in the Minneapolis Pioneers and Soldiers Memorial Cemetery

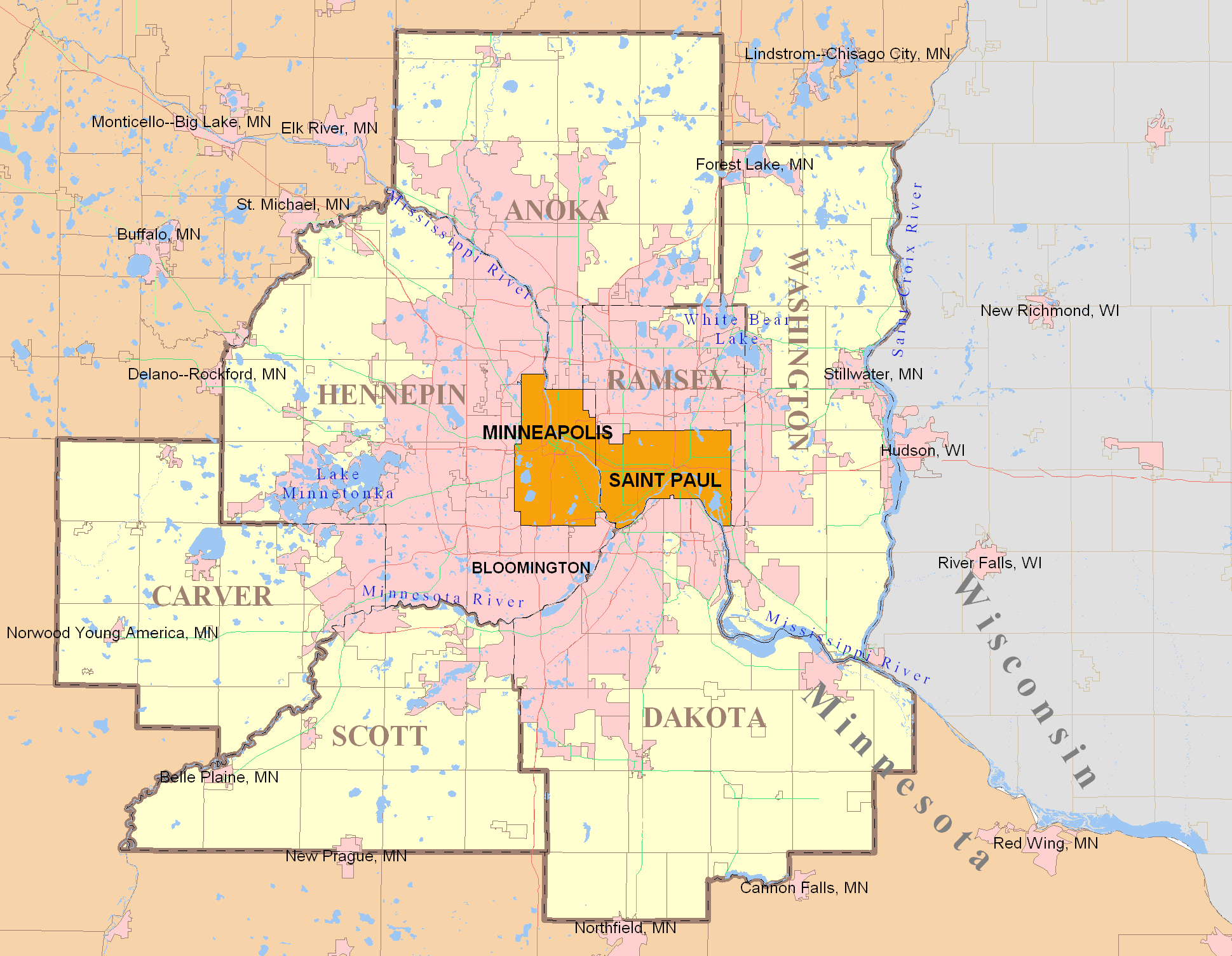
- Location within Minneapolis–Saint Paul Location within Minnesota Location within the United States
- Location: 2925 Cedar Avenue S., Minneapolis, Minnesota
- Coordinates: 44°56′58″N 93°14′42″W
- Area: 27 acres (11 ha)
- Built: 1858–1919 (burials), c. 1871 (caretaker's cottage), 1928–1936 (fencing and paths)
- NRHP reference No.: 02000612

Significant dates
- Added to NRHP: June 6, 2002
- Designated MPLSL: 2006

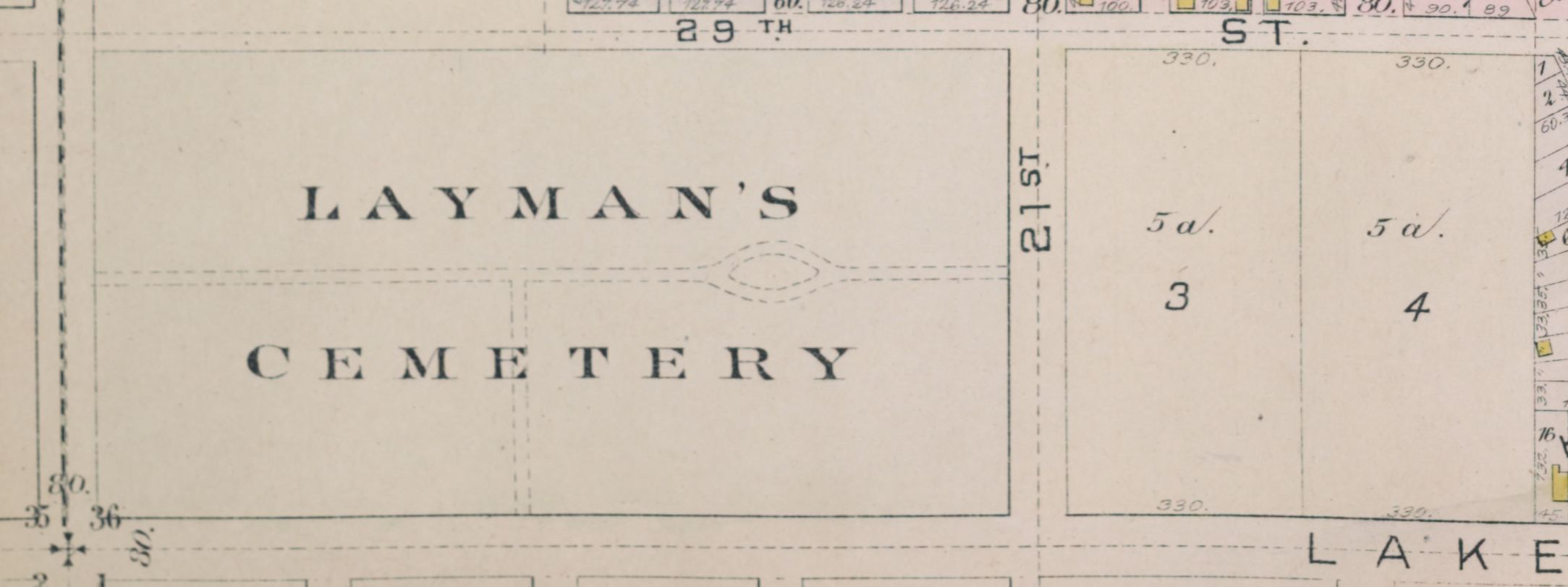
1885 map of Layman's Cemetery

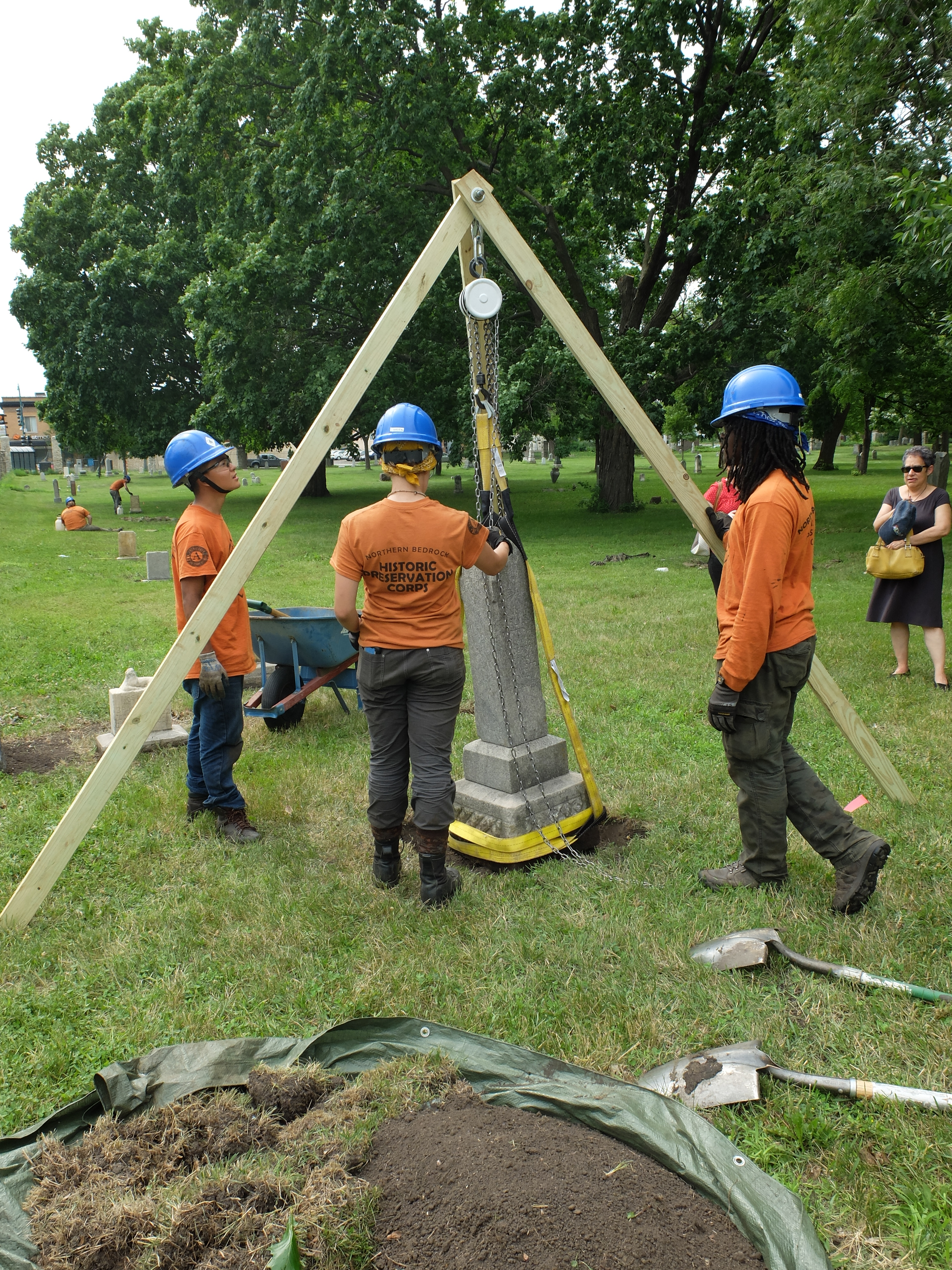
Restoration work on tombstones

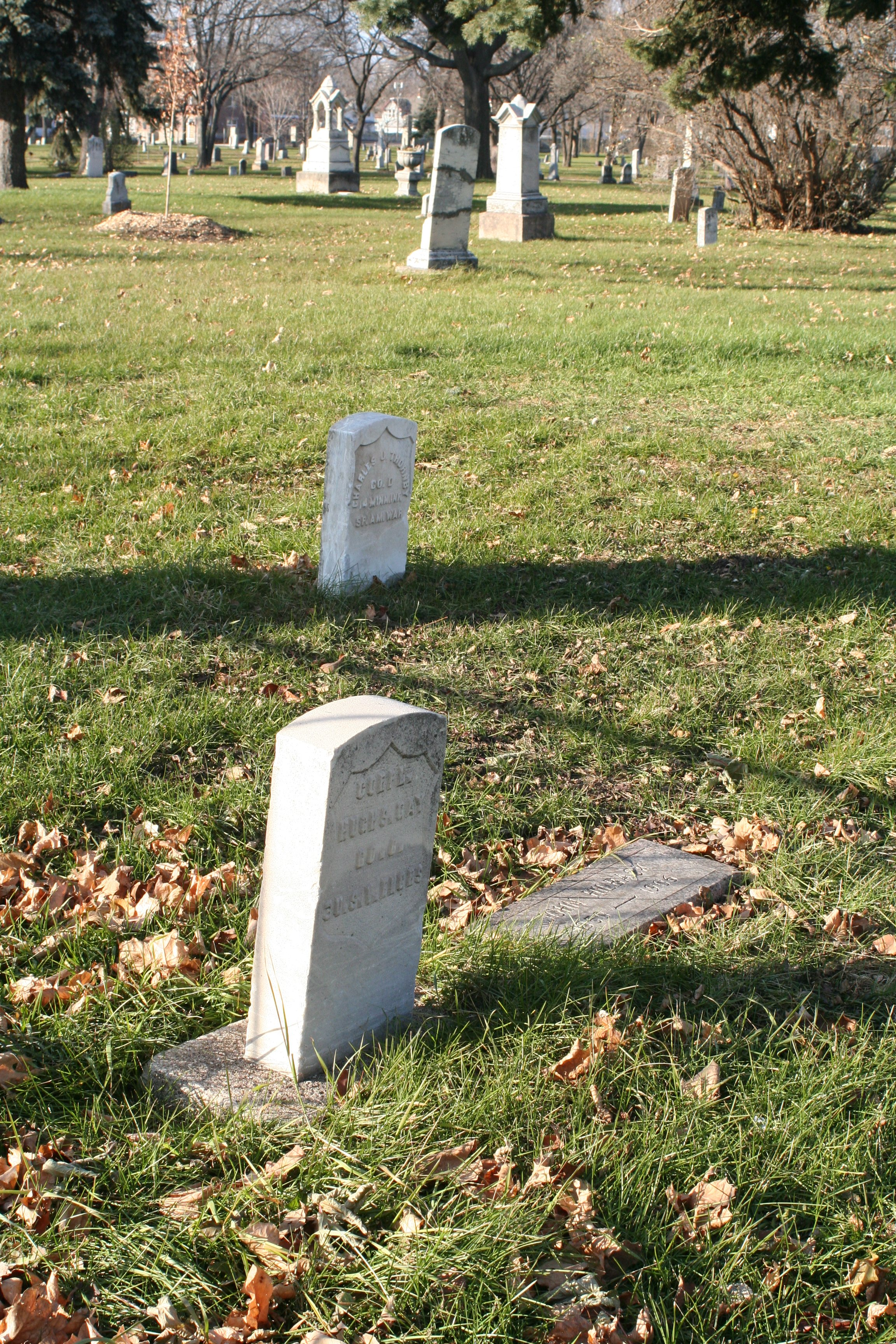
Marker for Charles J. Thornby, of Company D, 14th Minnesota Infantry, Spanish–American War

The Minneapolis Pioneers and Soldiers Memorial Cemetery is the oldest extant cemetery in Minneapolis, Minnesota, United States. It was established in 1858 as a privately owned burial ground known as Minneapolis Cemetery or Layman's Cemetery. By 1919 it was full, with more than 27,000 bodies, and was closed by the city government. Only a handful of burials have taken place there since.

The cemetery is located at the intersection of Lake Street and Cedar Avenue. Since the first burial in 1853, many prominent figures in the history of early Minneapolis have been buried there, along with territorial pioneers including Charles Christmas, Edwin Hedderly, and Philander Prescott. Approximately 200 military veterans who fought in wars ranging from the War of 1812 to World War I are buried in the cemetery. It is the burial site for many of the city's early African-American residents and for many people who had ties to the abolitionist movement in Minnesota. Several thousand immigrants, primarily from Scandinavia and Eastern Europe, are buried there, as are many of their children. Over half of the cemetery's 20,000 interments are children.

The cemetery was listed on the National Register of Historic Places in 2002 for its local significance in the theme of social history. It was nominated for reflecting both the city's pioneer era and an early historic preservation movement that saw the site restored from 1928 to 1936.

== Early history ==
Farmers Martin and Elizabeth Layman came to Minneapolis in 1853. Like many early Minnesotans, they were born in New York and made their way west in stages—in their case, by way of Peoria County, Illinois. They bought land at what later became the corner of Cedar Avenue and Lake Street in South Minneapolis. The Laymans seem to have gotten into the cemetery business by happenstance when, soon after they arrived, a Baptist pastor asked to bury his infant son, Carlton Cressey (or Cressy), on their land. The Laymans opened Minneapolis Cemetery in 1858 and expanded it to 10 acres (4 ha) in 1860. The Laymans, their farm, and the cemetery prospered, and the family built a stately house across from the cemetery gates on Cedar Street. Often known as Layman's Cemetery, it grew to 27 acres (11 ha) and eventually held around 27,000 remains.

Both Laymans died in 1886, and their house burned down soon after that. The burials continued, but maintenance declined. By 1919 the cemetery had reached capacity; that year, the city closed it to new burials. Over the next several years, some 7,000 remains were dug up and taken elsewhere. In 1928 the city of Minneapolis assumed responsibility for maintaining the cemetery. The city owns the physical structures (fence, flagpole, caretaker's cottage, etc.) and approximately 5,000 empty graves. The occupied graves remain the property of the families of the deceased.

== Burials ==
The "Pioneers" part of the name is more apt than "Soldiers". There are only about 190 identified veterans in the cemetery: one from World War I, four from the War of 1812, 21 from the Spanish–American War, the rest from the Civil War. About 25 are clustered in a small military plot, the rest scattered. Civil War veteran Oscar Vaughn (16th United States Colored Infantry) is one of many, perhaps hundreds, of African Americans buried at Pioneers and Soldiers.

Almost all the cemetery's remains belong to early residents of Minneapolis, many of them immigrants of humble means. Some headstones are carved in Swedish and German. A striking feature of the cemetery is the absence of large monuments; only a relative handful stand as high as five feet (1.5 m). Many headstones are tilted, missing, or broken, and some have been crudely patched together.

The headstones of old cemeteries often hint at sad stories—epidemics, industrial accidents, child mortality. Such stories are hard to find at Pioneers and Soldiers because so few markers can be read; most are marble, effaced long ago by time and the elements.

In 2003 Susan Hunter Weir published a history of the cemetery in Hennepin History Magazine, based in part on its paper records. She uncovered many touching stories: August Smith and Ole Shay, workers killed in the Washburn A Mill explosion of 1878; Harry T. Hayward, hanged for the 1894 murder-for-hire of Kitty Ging; 25 infants from the Cody Hospital, a so-called "baby farm", who died there in 1908 and 1909.

Weir also compiled some compelling statistics. Over half of the graves belong to children under the age of ten. A majority of all the burials resulted from communicable diseases that rarely kill people in the 21st century. Some 800 died from accidents (more than a hundred in railroad accidents) or homicide, and another 150 by their own hands. The cemetery silently testifies: life in Minneapolis was shorter, harder, and more uncertain a century and more ago.

== Recent history ==
The last known burial at Pioneers and Soldiers Cemetery took place in 1999. Though the cemetery is located in the middle of a busy, heavily trafficked neighborhood, the grounds are quiet. The low headstones, many unmarked graves, and tall trees give the place an open and park-like feel. It was added to the National Register of Historic Places in 2002. The Friends of Minneapolis Pioneers and Soldiers Memorial Cemetery maintains a searchable online database of burials.

== See also ==
- List of cemeteries in the United States
- National Register of Historic Places listings in Hennepin County, Minnesota
