= Murals of York, Pennsylvania =

Series of murals on buildings in York, Pennsylvania, U.S.

Coordinates: 39.9613°N 76.7315°W

The Murals of York, Pennsylvania are a series of murals painted on the sides of buildings in York, Pennsylvania between 1996 and 2002. Paid for with local donations, the murals provide the community with details about some lesser-known people, businesses, and customs of the city while adding artistic beauty. The York County History Center owns and shares rights to the use of the mural images.

== History ==
In the 1990s a group of individuals from York traveled to Chemainus, Vancouver Island, British Columbia. David Carver, the president of the York Redevelopment Committee at that time, was among the group. Chemainus had a series of murals depicting the town's history that had been successful in drawing tourism to the area. The York group was interested in viewing these murals and deciding whether a project like this would work in York. A committee was later formed and the York Mural Project was begun. There are a total of 18 large murals and a series of mini-murals. Each mural depicts the history or York and is painted on the side of a building. The first mural was painted in 1996. It depicted the Harley-Davidson plant. The first mini-mural was painted in 1998. The last mural was completed in 2002. The murals are unique because they depict some little known people and events in York's history. Each mural tells a little story. The money to pay for the mural project came from donations from businesses and townspeople who were interested in the project.

The murals were painted during the day by artists who used scaffolding. The mini-murals were copies from a book by Lewis Miller; these mural images were projected on the wall via an overhead projector at night and sketched, for painting during the day.

A coat of Dryvit was applied as a base for each mural. Outdoor house paint was used and then covered with a clear coat. The clear coat protects the mural from weather and graffiti. The life of each mural is about 20 years. Some of them are already disintegrating.

Ownership and any maintenance of the murals reverts after 20 years to those who own the buildings on which they are painted, and a mural adoption program began in the mid-2010s to facilitate partnerships with building owners for maintenance. The York County History Center has archived photographs and documentation of the murals.

== Lewis Miller mini murals ==
Lewis Miller's drawings provide visual clues about what life was like in the 19th century in York. Miller did some humorous drawing such as his portrayal of Mrs. Schreck. She had yellow toenails that were so long that Mr. Schreck had to cut them off with a saw, and she could not wear shoes. Artist Justine Landis and her daughter, Lori Straup turned Lewis Miller's drawings into mini murals. The mini murals include humor but also show serious scenes about 19th-century life. Some mini murals bear Miller's writing in both German and English underneath them. Most Yorkers spoke at least some German in the 18th and early 19th centuries. One mural shows him at work in his carpentry shop. Miller had hundreds of drawings in his journal and a committee selected which ones to feature as murals. While larger than Miller's drawings, the mini murals are smaller than the other Murals of York. Some are featured in Cherry Lane park, and on the side of the town's Central Market house. There are 16 mini murals in all.

== Four Chaplains ==
The top of the mural shows the Four Chaplains that sacrificed their lives. The four people that are at the top of the mural are George L. Fox, (Methodist); Clark V. Poling, (Dutch Reformed); Alexander D. Goode (Jewish); and John P. Washington, (Roman Catholic). Alexander D. Goode lived in York. Among the Four Chaplains there is a rope connecting each portrait representing their love and peace together. There is also a life raft hanging from the long rope that represents the life rafts that the Four Chaplains gave up for other people. The middle shows the Chaplains linking arms. They are very faint in the mural because they are rising up to heaven together. The bottom of the mural shows the very icy waters that represent the Four Chaplains' graves. One will always remember the history of the Four Chaplains because they sacrificed their lives to save other people when a torpedo hit their ship during World War II. The mural reminds people of this act of bravery.

== Community Contributors ==
The Community Contributors mural is layered like a cake. This mural, The Community Contributors mural has a first layer, a second layer, and even a third layer. The first layer is about the people that help our community such as Samuel Small, John C. Schmidt, Josephine N. McClelland, and A.B. Farquhar. Each one did something really good. For example, Samuel Small helped found the York Collegiate Institute that is now the York College of Pennsylvania. Farquhar is known as one of York's leading businessmen in the Industrial Revolution and philanthropist. He also made contact with the Confederates early in the Civil War and learned information that would help the Union. Josephine N. McClelland was known for being a local teacher that helped found the YWCA and was a prominent suffragette. John C. Schmidt was a prominent businessman and helped form the first York Bank and was one of the founders of York Manufacturing Association as well as starting a chain company and Schmidt and Ault Paper Company. He also started the York chapter of the American Red Cross during World War I. The second layer is about the community's commitment to help one another. This commitment comes in various fields-arts and education, children and family's, health care, sports, and work. A monument brings together several deceased leaders whose legacy honors the community—George Bowles, Mahlon Haines, Anna Huber, Ben Lavetan, Thomas Hartley and Charles S. Wolf. The third layer is about various services. There are a lot of organizations helping our community. Some of these are fire stations, churches, and libraries. They all helped in special way. The background is telling us that for over 250 years people have really been helping one another.

== Dr. George Holtzapple ==
Dr. George Holtzapple, a creative and intelligent physician is the focus of this York mural. The artist, Wayne Fettro, painted this mural to represent Dr. Holtzapple's achievements. On the right, the mural shows Holtzapple. He was smart enough to make a way to give air for a 16-year-old boy who could not breathe. Also, on the right side of the mural is the invention that Dr. Holtzapple used to give the boy air. This mural shows when Dr. Holtzapple got a call that a sixteen-year-old boy could not breathe. The boy really needed Dr. Holtzapple's help. Dr. Holtzapple has been a doctor for less than a year. It was 1885 when Dr. Holtzapple got call from the sixteen-year-old boy's family. They said the boy could not breathe and had pneumonia. When Dr. Holtzapple arrived the boy told him "Give me air!" Dr. Holtzapple tried an experiment to produce oxygen. His experiment worked and Dr. Holtzapple gained credit for this treatment of pneumonia! The left side of the mural includes an image of the doctor and some information about him. The mural was finished in October 2000. The size of the mural was 25 feet and 6 inches wide and 16 feet high. Dr. Holtzapple's invention was later used to treat pneumonia and widely used in World War I for victims of gas attacks.

== The Children's Home ==
The Children's Home mural represents more than 100 years of caring for children across central Pennsylvania. An orphanage was founded by Samuel Small and run by Mary Sitler Cooper to aid white children whose family structure was disrupted by the Civil War. The home eventually opened its doors to all types of children in need. Counselors, volunteer mentors and foster parents care for children of all ages and races, and connect them to the community with attendance at public schools, Boy Scouts, Girl Scouts, and the YMCA. The Children's Home expanded with a new home constructed in Springettsbury Township.

The original Children's Home, demolished in 1973, was on the southeast corner of Philadelphia and Pine streets. The left part of the Children's Home mural shows Civil War orphans. To the right, it depicts creator Samuel Small. Farther over are a teacher, a girl, a boy, and one other boy on a rocking horse. Behind them are three children running to the right of the mural. On the far right is the current building, built in 1990. A man with a child points to the right as if he is pointing to the future. The home is known as a place that cares for those who are in need, and works to make life better for them. Don and Jared Gray are the mural's artists. Measuring 80 feet wide and 18 feet high, it was finished by September 2000 at 132 South George Street and sponsored by the Children's Home of York.

== William Goodridge ==
As a conductor and stationmaster on the Underground Railroad, William C. Goodridge helped freedom seekers escape slavery. Born a slave in Baltimore, Maryland, he became a successful businessman and entrepreneur in York, then risked it all to help others. As shown in the right corner of the Goodridge mural, there is a baby with a mother. This baby is William Goodridge. Also, in the right corner, there is a young boy. This is William Goodridge as a child. William was born a slave. Later, in 1822, he was freed and then he opened a 5-story building, and a Barbershop on York Centre Square. After he was freed he started helping other slaves through the Underground Railroad. Don and Jared Gray painted this mural to honor him. The mural was finished in 2000, in the month of June. The mural is 24 feet wide and 23 feet high. The reason they created this mural was to show that if one is determined to do something one can do it, just like William Goodridge. He inspired us all. Even enough to make a mural about him!

== York Goes to War: A Community Responds ==
This 28-feet-high and 80-feet-wide mural can be seen along South George Street on the north wall of Bell Socialization Service. Michael Webb was the talented artist who created and painted the mural in August 1999. The York Goes to War mural is a reflection of how the community of York came together during World War II. During this time York had factories that manufactured and supplied weaponry. Many men in the community went to war, so the women had to take over the factories. The role of women changed and they became a more important part of the community. The people of York would often be heard saying, "Do what you can with what you have." They did what they could even though they were a small community. York received several flags from the government, which can be seen in the mural. The E flags represent excellence and pride in the work that the community of York contributed.

== The Articles of Confederation ==
The mural was finished in 1999 and one can go see it today at 166 West Market Street. The mural shows the members of the Second Continental Congress meeting to discuss the Articles of Confederation at the courthouse in York. The Articles of Confederation included rules that they wanted the 13 colonies to follow. Many men took a lot of time to discuss what should be in the Articles of Confederation, which were sent to the 13 colonies for approval in 1777. The Articles of Confederation were also adopted as the nation's first Constitution. The mural shows the important role York played in the writing of the Articles of Confederation. The mural is 21 feet wide and 20 feet high. David Naydock from Pottsville brought this special moment to life.

== York Fair ==
Artist Alan Wylie completed the York Fair mural in 1999. It is 120 feet wide and 24 feet tall. The panels of the mural show how the York Fair has changed since it originally began in 1765. The fair continues to grow and includes a petting zoo where one can see cows, pigs, and bunnies; there are games, rides, concerts, fireworks, and other entertainment. The fair takes place during the month of September. Now most people don't ride horses to the fair or march in a parade, but many people still find time to enjoy the special activities. One year over 700,000 people attended the fair. One can check out the colorful mural on East Market Street near Duke Street.

== York in the 1880s ==
The artist of the York in the 1800s century mural is C. Michael Svob. The mural is about life in York in the 19th century. The mural shows special landmarks and lets the viewer catch a glimpse of what these landmarks looked like in York during the 19th century. It features landmarks in York such as the National House, the White Hall Hotel, the City Market House and Codorus Creek. York's population increased during the 19th century and the creativity of York's people also developed during this time. The York in the 1800s mural is 60 feet wide by 20 feet high. One can find this mural at 237 West Market Street along the East Wall.

== Muscletown USA ==
This mural was finished in August 2000. It was painted by Max Mason. It is 27 feet wide and 22 feet high. It was painted because Bob Hoffman was called the "Father of Weightlifting" and the York Barbell company is very popular. Bob Hoffman also donated land to the YMCA to create the Dover Branch of the YMCA. In the mural one can also see Tommy Kono and John Grimek. It is located at 37 West Philadelphia Street in York.

== York Manufacturing Company ==
This mural was finished in 1995. It was painted by Dan Hendrix. It is 32 feet wide and 35 feet high. It was painted because York Manufacturing was an important company in York. York manufacturing made ice-making machinery. The mural includes a huge wheel that was part of a machine that helped to keep things cold. It is located at 150 Roosevelt Avenue in York.

== Made In York ==
This mural was finished in 1998. It was painted by David Nadyock. It is 17 feet wide and 17 feet high, so it is a square. The mural includes a Pullman car. They were made in York. The company started in 1903 and went out of business in 1917. They were known for making a six-wheeled car. One can find this mural at 243 West Market Street in York.

== From Farm to Market ==
This mural was finished in 1997. It was painted by Marion Stephenson. It is 32 feet wide and 26 feet high. The mural includes the fields and the market where people took things that they grew to sell. The market in York started in 1755. There is still the Central Market in York that people still go to today. One can find this mural at 36 North Beaver Street across from the York Central Market.

== The Harley-Davidson Tradition ==
This mural was finished in 1996 and was the first one painted in the Murals of York series. It was painted by Michael Svob. The mural is 34 feet wide and 26 feet tall. The mural is about Harley-Davidson motorcycles. The company came to York in 1973 and used a plant that used to make bombs and bowling balls. The mural shows motorcycles in downtown York, the Jefferson Hill Climb, and people working on motorcycles. One can find this mural at 258 West Market Street in York.

== The History of Pottery ==
Located at 50 North George Street, this mural by Michael Webb was finished in 1998. It is 70 feet wide and 24 feet high. The mural focuses on the importance of the Pfaltzgraff Company in York. The company began in 1811 and is the oldest operating commercial pottery maker in the United States. The mural includes some of Pfaltzgraff's most recognizable designs, a time line of the company's products, and illustrations of the pottery-making process. The mural also incorporates a drainpipe on the building that was painted as a flagpole in the mural.

== The Power of the Printing Press ==
This mural was finished in 1999. It was painted by Alan Wylie. It is 28 feet wide and 20 feet high. The mural is about things being printed in York. The Continental Congress used the printing press a lot when they were in York. They needed things made to help raise support for their fight against the British. York's first newspaper was the Pennsylvania Gazette which was published from December 20, 1777, to June 20, 1778. One can find this mural at 223 North George Street in York.

== Sources ==
- McClure, James (1999). Never To Be Forgotten. York, PA: York Daily Record. pp. 10–14, 37–210. ISBN 1-929348-06-1.
- McClure, James. "The Murals Of York, A Walking Guide". York Daily Record. York Daily Record. Archived from the original on 2 December 2010.
