= Clark V. Poling =

United States Army chaplain (1910-1943)

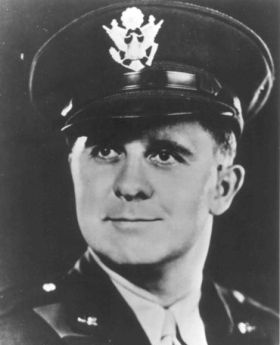
- Clark V. Poling
- Born: August 7, 1910; Columbus, Ohio, US
- Died: February 3, 1943 (aged 32); Dorchester, Atlantic Ocean
- Military career
- Allegiance: United States
- Branch: United States Army
- Service years: 1941 to 1943
- Rank: Chaplain Lieutenant
- Conflicts: World War II
- Awards: Chaplain's Medal for Heroism; Distinguished Service Cross; Purple Heart

Clark Vandersall Poling (August 7, 1910 – February 3, 1943) was a minister in the Reformed Church in America and a lieutenant in the United States Army. He was one of the Four Chaplains who gave their lives to save other soldiers during the sinking of the troop transport Dorchester during World War II.

== Life ==
Poling was born in Columbus, Ohio, to Dr. Daniel Alfred Poling (1884–1968), an Evangelical minister, and Susan Jane Vandersall (1882–1918). He was raised in Auburndale, Massachusetts, where he attended Whitney Public School. He had three siblings, Daniel, Mary and Elizabeth. His mother died in 1918; his father remarried in 1919 and converted to the Baptist faith, becoming an ordained minister. The family moved to Poughkeepsie, New York, and Poling attended Oakwood School where he excelled on the football team.

After graduation he attended Hope College in Michigan and then Rutgers University in New Jersey, graduating in 1933. He then attended Yale Divinity School, graduating with a Bachelor of Divinity in 1936. He then took up a position as pastor of the First Reformed Church in Schenectady, New York, where he settled with his wife Elizabeth Jung and their son Clark Jr. ("Corky"). A daughter, Susan Elizabeth, was born three months after his death.

At the outbreak of war in 1941, Poling immediately volunteered for service as an Army chaplain in the footsteps of his father, who had served as a chaplain during World War I. He initially served in Mississippi with a transport regiment.

== Death ==
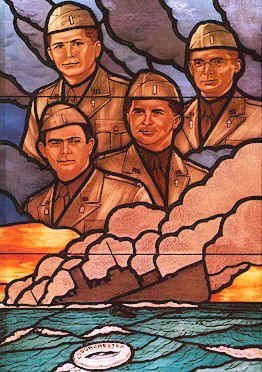
Four Chaplains

In late 1942, Poling was transferred to Camp Myles Standish in Taunton, Massachusetts, and attended Chaplains School at Harvard University. There he met fellow chaplains George L. Fox, Alexander D. Goode and John P. Washington. In January 1943, the chaplains embarked on board the Dorchester, which was transporting over 900 soldiers to the United Kingdom via Greenland.

On February 2, 1943, the German submarine U-223 spotted the convoy on the move and closed with the ships, firing a torpedo which struck the Dorchester shortly after midnight. Hundreds of men packed the decks of the rapidly sinking ship and scrambled for the lifeboats. Several of the lifeboats had been damaged, and the four chaplains began to organize frightened soldiers. They distributed life jackets from a locker; when the supply of life jackets ran out, each of the chaplains gave theirs to other soldiers. When the last lifeboats were away, the chaplains prayed with those unable to escape the sinking ship. Twenty-seven minutes after the torpedo struck, the Dorchester disappeared below the waves with 672 men still aboard. The last anyone saw of the four chaplains, they were standing on the deck, arms linked and praying together.

== Remembrance ==
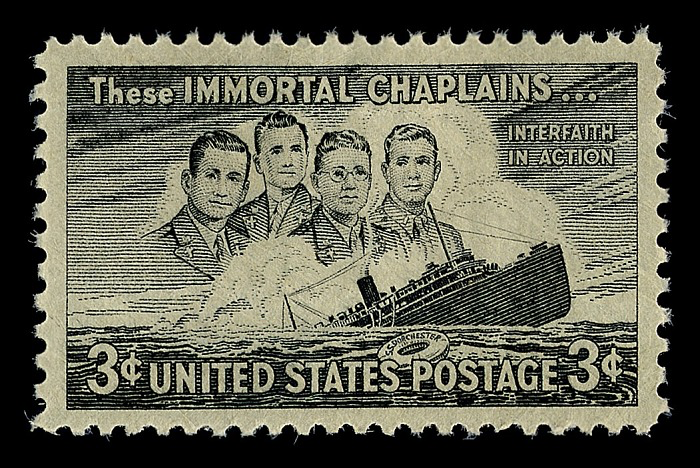
Four Chaplains stamp, 1948

The four chaplains were all awarded the Distinguished Service Cross and the Purple Heart and received national acclaim for their courage and self-sacrifice. A chapel in their honor was dedicated on February 3, 1951, by President Harry S. Truman at Grace Baptist Church of Philadelphia. The Four Chaplains' Medal was established by act of Congress on July 14, 1960, and was presented posthumously to their next of kin by Secretary of the Army Wilber M. Brucker at Ft. Myer, Virginia, on January 18, 1961.

Clark V. Poling is honored with a Lesser Feast along with the rest of the Four Chaplains (Alexander D. Goode, John P. Washington and George L. Fox) on the liturgical calendar of the Episcopal Church in the United States of America on February 3.

The high point of the town of Deering, New Hampshire, formerly known as Wolf Hill (1,570 ft; 480 m) was renamed Clark Summit in Poling's honor, and a memorial plaque was placed at the summit outlook. "Located on what was once family land, Clark thought this was a peaceful place and would often go there to reflect on big decisions in his life. In fact, it was at Wolf Hill's summit that Clark decided to become a minister."
