= John P. Washington =

American Catholic priest and soldier (1908-1943)

The Reverend Father John P. Washington
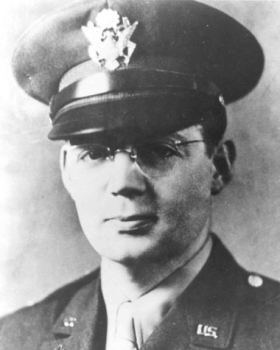
- Church: Roman Catholic Church
- Archdiocese: Roman Catholic Archdiocese for the Military Services, USA

Orders
- Ordination: 1935 (priest)

Personal details
- Born: John Patrick Washington; July 18, 1908 Newark, New Jersey, US
- Died: February 3, 1943 (aged 34) Dorchester, Atlantic Ocean
- Denomination: Catholicism
- Occupation: Military chaplain
- Education: Seton Hall Preparatory School
- Alma mater: Seton Hall University
- Military career
- Allegiance: United States of America
- Branch: United States Army
- Service years: 1942 to 1943
- Rank: Chaplain Lieutenant
- Conflicts: World War II
- Awards: Chaplain's Medal for Heroism; Distinguished Service Cross; Purple Heart

John Patrick Washington (July 18, 1908 – February 3, 1943) was a Catholic priest and a lieutenant in the United States Army. He was one of the Four Chaplains, who gave their lives to save other soldiers during the sinking of the troop transport Dorchester during World War II.

== Life ==
Born as one of seven children to Irish immigrants Frank and Mary Washington, John was a religious boy from a young age, rapidly becoming an altar boy at his local church in Newark, New Jersey, where he grew up. A talented sportsman and intelligent and hard-working child, he performed well at school and was accepted into Seton Hall Preparatory School, then located in South Orange, New Jersey, where he completed high school and took courses designed to prepare him for the priesthood. Following his graduation he moved to the Immaculate Conception Seminary School of Theology at Seton Hall University. He took minor orders in 1933, and was ordained as a Catholic priest in 1935.

He served at several New Jersey parishes over the next six years, before joining the Army upon learning of the attack on Pearl Harbor that took place on December 7, 1941. After brief periods in Indiana and Maryland, Washington was dispatched to Harvard University, where he took a course preparing him for deployment for Europe and became acquainted with the others of the Four Chaplains for the first time. In January 1943 he joined them on board the Dorchester for the trip to Europe via Greenland, and set off on the fatal journey.

== Death ==
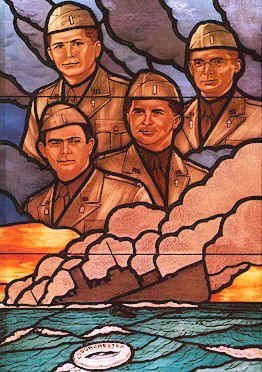
Four Chaplains

In late 1942, Washington was transferred to Camp Myles Standish in Taunton, Massachusetts, and attended Chaplains School at Harvard University. There he met fellow chaplains George L. Fox, Alexander D. Goode and Clark V. Poling. In January 1943, the chaplains embarked on board the Dorchester, which was transporting over 900 soldiers to the United Kingdom via Greenland.

On February 2, 1943, the German submarine U-223 spotted the convoy on the move and closed with the ships, firing a torpedo which struck the Dorchester shortly after midnight. Hundreds of men packed the decks of the rapidly sinking ship and scrambled for the lifeboats. Several of the lifeboats had been damaged and the four chaplains began to organize frightened soldiers. They distributed life jackets from a locker; when the supply of life jackets ran out, each of the chaplains gave theirs to other soldiers. When the last lifeboats were away, the chaplains prayed with those unable to escape the sinking ship. Twenty-seven minutes after the torpedo struck, the Dorchester disappeared below the waves, with 672 men still aboard. The last anyone saw of the four chaplains, they were standing on the deck, arms linked and praying together.

== Remembrance ==
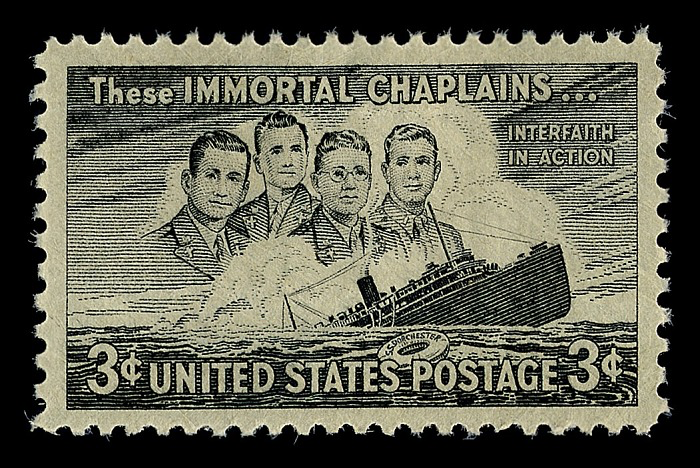
Four Chaplains stamp, 1948

The four chaplains were all awarded the Distinguished Service Cross and the Purple Heart and received national acclaim for their courage and self-sacrifice. A chapel in their honor was dedicated on February 3, 1951, by President Harry S. Truman at Grace Baptist Church of Philadelphia. The Four Chaplains' Medal was established by act of Congress on July 14, 1960, and was presented posthumously to their next of kin by Secretary of the Army Wilber M. Brucker at Fort Myer, Virginia, on January 18, 1961.

John P. Washington is honored with a Lesser Feast along with the rest of the Four Chaplains (Alexander D. Goode, George L. Fox and Clark V. Poling) on the liturgical calendar of the Episcopal Church in the United States of America on February 3.

The U.S. Army's Fort Benning honored the Four Chaplains by naming a field in their honor outside the base's main Protestant chapel.

The Chaplain Washington Bridge in Newark and Kearny, New Jersey, which carries Interstate 95/ New Jersey Turnpike, is named after Washington.

== See also ==
- Chaplain Corps (United States Army)
- Roman Catholic Archdiocese for the Military Services, USA
