= George L. Fox (chaplain) =

US army chaplain killed in action

George Lansing Fox
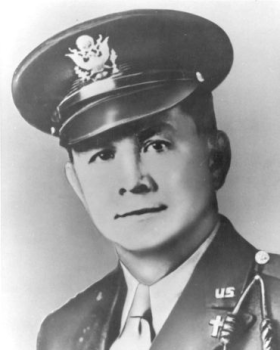
- Born: March 15, 1900; Lewistown, Pennsylvania, US
- Died: February 3, 1943 (aged 42); Dorchester, Atlantic Ocean
- Education: Illinois Wesleyan (BA); Boston University (STB)
- Spouse: Isadora G. Hurlbut
- Military career
- Allegiance: United States
- Branch: United States Army
- Service years: 1917 to 1918; 1942 to 1943
- Rank: Chaplain Lieutenant
- Conflicts: World War I World War II
- Awards: Chaplain's Medal for Heroism; Distinguished Service Cross; Silver Star; Purple Heart (2); French Croix de Guerre

George Lansing Fox (March 15, 1900 – February 3, 1943) was a Methodist minister and a lieutenant in the United States Army. He was one of the Four Chaplains who gave their lives to save other soldiers during the sinking of the troop transport Dorchester during World War II.

== Life ==
George L. Fox was born in Lewistown, Pennsylvania, in 1900, one of five children. At 17 he ran away to join the army and served on the Western Front during World War I as a medical orderly, receiving the Silver Star, the Purple Heart, and the Croix de Guerre for his meritorious service. Following the war, Fox completed high school and briefly worked for a Trust Company. Fox married in 1923 and his son, Wyatt Ray was born a year later. Fox studied at Moody Bible Institute and earned a BA from Illinois Wesleyan University in 1931. Following graduation, Fox became an itinerant Methodist preacher, holding posts in Downs, Illinois, and Rye, New Hampshire. In 1934, he earned a Bachelor of Sacred Theology from the Boston University School of Theology and becoming an ordained Methodist minister.

That same year, he took over the church in Waits River, Vermont, and his daughter, Mary Elizabeth, was born. He remained in Vermont, moving church twice and becoming the state chaplain and historian for the American Legion. He was pastor at East Concord Methodist Church in East Concord, Vermont and there joined the Moose River Lodge 82 of Freemasonry. A historic sign stands in front of the church commemorating his service. The former Gilman United Methodist Church which is two miles from the East Concord Church is now the Rev. George Lansing Fox Memorial Chapel.

In 1942, Fox joined the army for a second time, with his son enlisted in the Marine Corps on the same day. In August 1942, he attended Chaplains School at Harvard University. There he met fellow chaplain Alexander D. Goode.

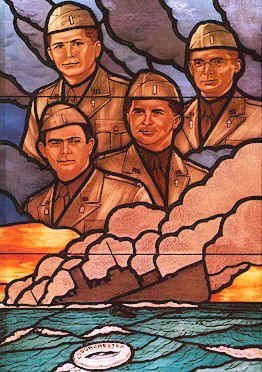
Four Chaplains

After Chaplains' School, Fox was transferred to Camp Myles Standish in Taunton, Massachusetts. There Fox and Goode met chaplains Clark V. Poling and John P. Washington. In January 1943, Fox and his fellow chaplains boarded the SS Dorchester, which was carrying some 900 soldiers to the United Kingdom.

== Death ==
On February 2, 1943, the German submarine U-223 spotted the convoy and fired a torpedo which struck the Dorchester shortly after midnight. Hundreds of men packed the decks of the rapidly sinking ship and scrambled for the lifeboats. Several of the lifeboats had been damaged and the four chaplains began to organize the passengers. They distributed life jackets from a locker; when the supply of life jackets ran out, each of the chaplains gave theirs to other soldiers. When the last lifeboats were away, the chaplains prayed with those unable to escape the sinking ship. Twenty-seven minutes after the torpedo struck, the Dorchester sank with 672 men still aboard. The last anyone saw of the four chaplains, they were standing on the deck, arms linked and praying together.

== Remembrance ==
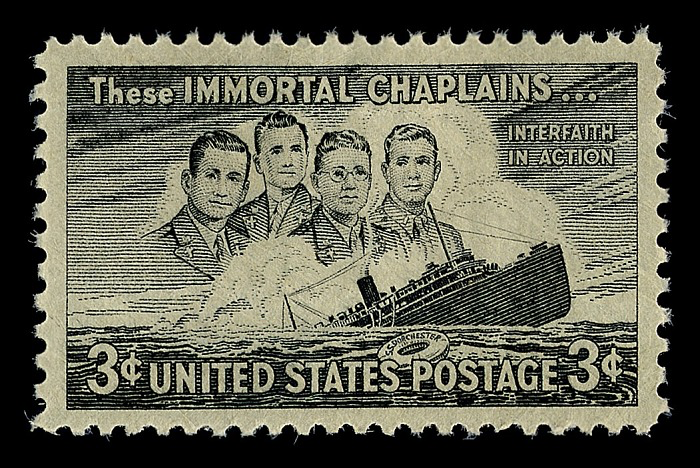
Four Chaplains stamp, 1948

The four chaplains were each awarded the Distinguished Service Cross and Purple Heart medals, receiving national acclaim for their courage and self-sacrifice. A chapel in their honor was dedicated on February 3, 1951, by President Harry S. Truman at Grace Baptist Church of Philadelphia. The Four Chaplains' Medal was established by act of Congress on July 14, 1960, and was presented posthumously to their next of kin by Secretary of the Army Wilber M. Brucker in 1961.

George L. Fox is honored with a Lesser Feast along with the rest of the Four Chaplains on the liturgical calendar of the Episcopal Church in the United States of America on February 3.

== See also ==
- List of Moody Bible Institute people
