= Alexander D. Goode =

American rabbi and chaplain

Alexander David Goode
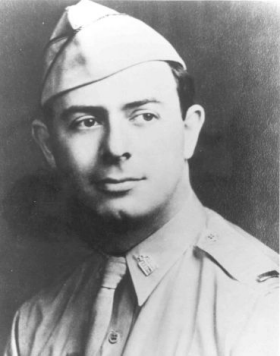
- Born: May 10, 1911; Brooklyn, New York, US
- Died: February 3, 1943 (aged 31); Dorchester, Atlantic Ocean
- Military career
- Allegiance: United States of America
- Branch: United States Army
- Service years: 1942 to 1943
- Rank: Chaplain Lieutenant
- Conflicts: World War II
- Awards: Chaplain's Medal for Heroism; Distinguished Service Cross; Purple Heart

Alexander David Goode (May 10, 1911 – February 3, 1943) was a rabbi and a lieutenant in the United States Army. He was one of the Four Chaplains who gave their lives to save other soldiers during the sinking of the troop transport Dorchester during World War II.

== Life ==
Born in Brooklyn, New York, in 1911, Goode was one of four children of Brooklyn rabbi Hyman Goodekowitz. Raised in Washington, D.C., Goode excelled at sports at Eastern High School.

In 1934, he earned an associate's degree from the University of Cincinnati. After graduating from Cincinnati's Hebrew Union College (HUC) in 1937, he was ordained as a rabbi. While studying at HUC, he spent summers working as a rabbinic student at the Washington Hebrew Congregation. In 1940, he received his Ph.D from Johns Hopkins University. He was married in 1935 to Teresa Flax, niece of Al Jolson, with whom he had one daughter, Rosalie.

Goode served as a rabbi in Marion, Indiana, and York, Pennsylvania. In 1941, Goode founded Boy Scout Troop 37 in York as a multi-cultural mixed race troop, the first troop in the U.S. to have scouts earn Catholic, Jewish, and Protestant awards.

In that same year, he applied to become a Navy chaplain but was turned down. The following year he was accepted into the Army, with orders to Harvard where he studied at the chaplain's school in preparation for deployment to Europe followed by brief service at an airbase in Goldsboro, North Carolina. In October 1942, he joined the other members of the Four Chaplains and was detailed to embark on the Dorchester a few months later.

== Death ==
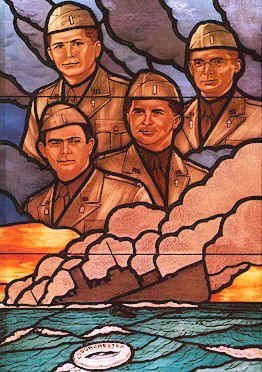
Four Chaplains

In late 1942, Goode was transferred to Camp Myles Standish in Taunton, Massachusetts, and attended Chaplains School at Harvard University. There he met fellow chaplains George L. Fox, Clark V. Poling and John P. Washington. In January 1943, the chaplains embarked on board the Dorchester, which was transporting over 900 soldiers to the United Kingdom via Greenland.

On February 2, 1943, the German submarine U-223 spotted the convoy on the move and closed with the ships, firing a torpedo which struck the Dorchester shortly after midnight. Hundreds of men packed the decks of the rapidly sinking ship and scrambled for the lifeboats. Several of the lifeboats had been damaged and the four chaplains began to organize frightened soldiers. They distributed life jackets from a locker; when the supply of life jackets ran out, each of the chaplains gave his to other soldiers. When the last lifeboats were away, the chaplains prayed with those unable to escape the sinking ship. Twenty-seven minutes after the torpedo struck, the Dorchester disappeared below the waves with 672 men still aboard. The last anyone saw of the four chaplains, they were standing on the deck, arms linked and praying together.

== Remembrance ==
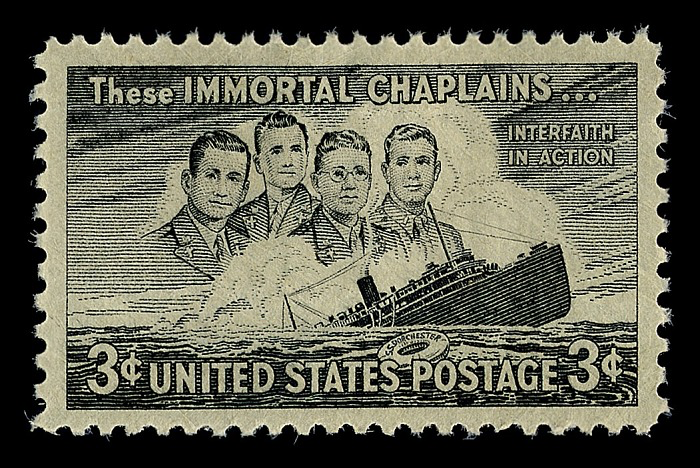
Four Chaplains stamp, 1948

The four chaplains were all awarded the Distinguished Service Cross and the Purple Heart and received national acclaim for their courage and self-sacrifice. A chapel in their honor was dedicated on February 3, 1951, by President Harry S. Truman at Grace Baptist Church of Philadelphia. The Four Chaplains' Medal was established by act of Congress on July 14, 1960, and was presented posthumously to their next of kin by Secretary of the Army Wilber M. Brucker at Ft. Myer, Virginia, on January 18, 1961.

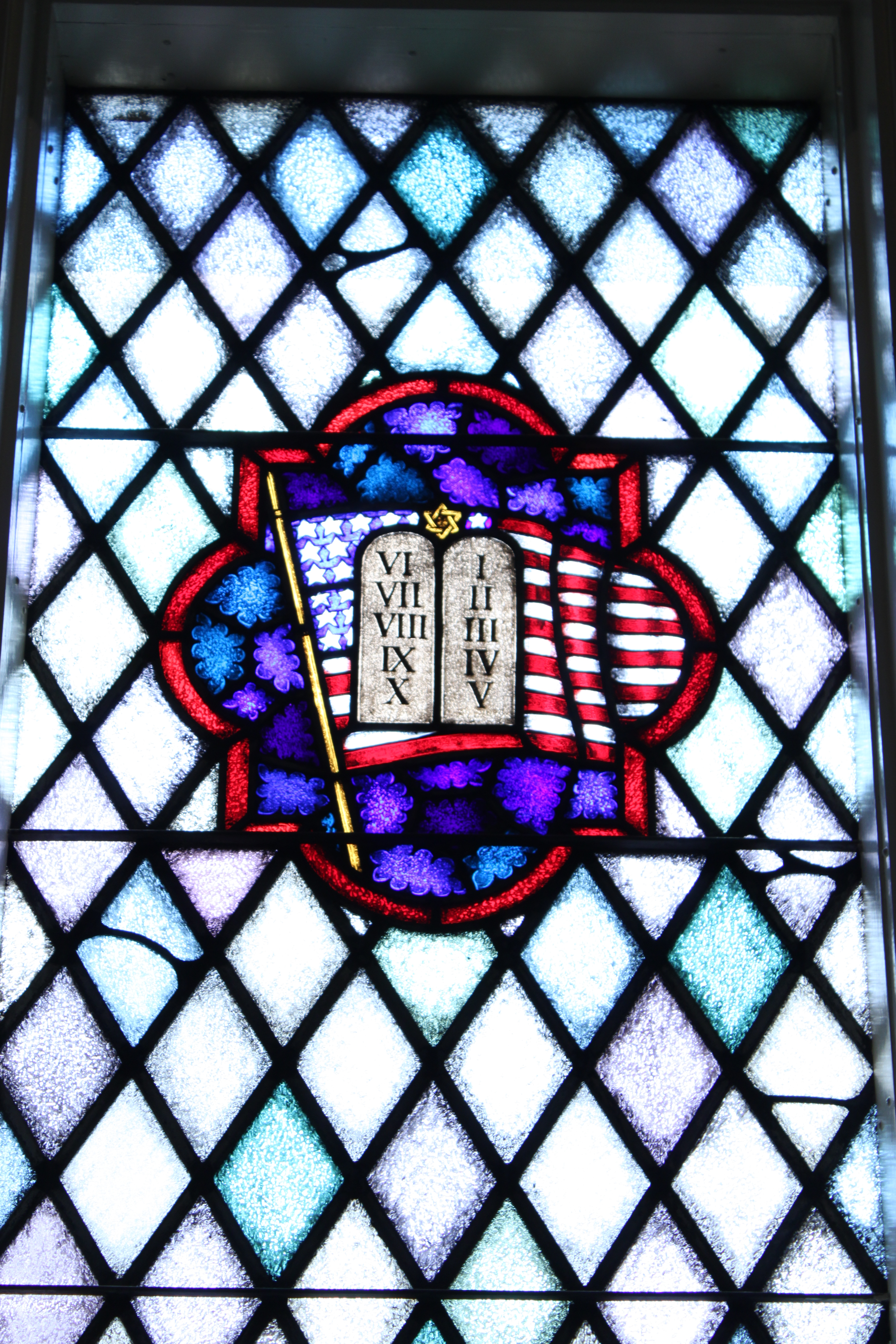
Alumni Service Window at Hebrew Union College

In memory of Rabbi Goode, the Alumni Service Window, showing the Jewish Chaplaincy insignia superimposed over an American flag, was dedicated at the Cincinnati campus of HUC on January 12–14, 1948. The inscription on the window reads: “In honor of our colleagues, students and alumni of the Hebrew Union College who served their country in two World Wars, 1917-18–1941-45.”
