= Four Chaplains' Medal =

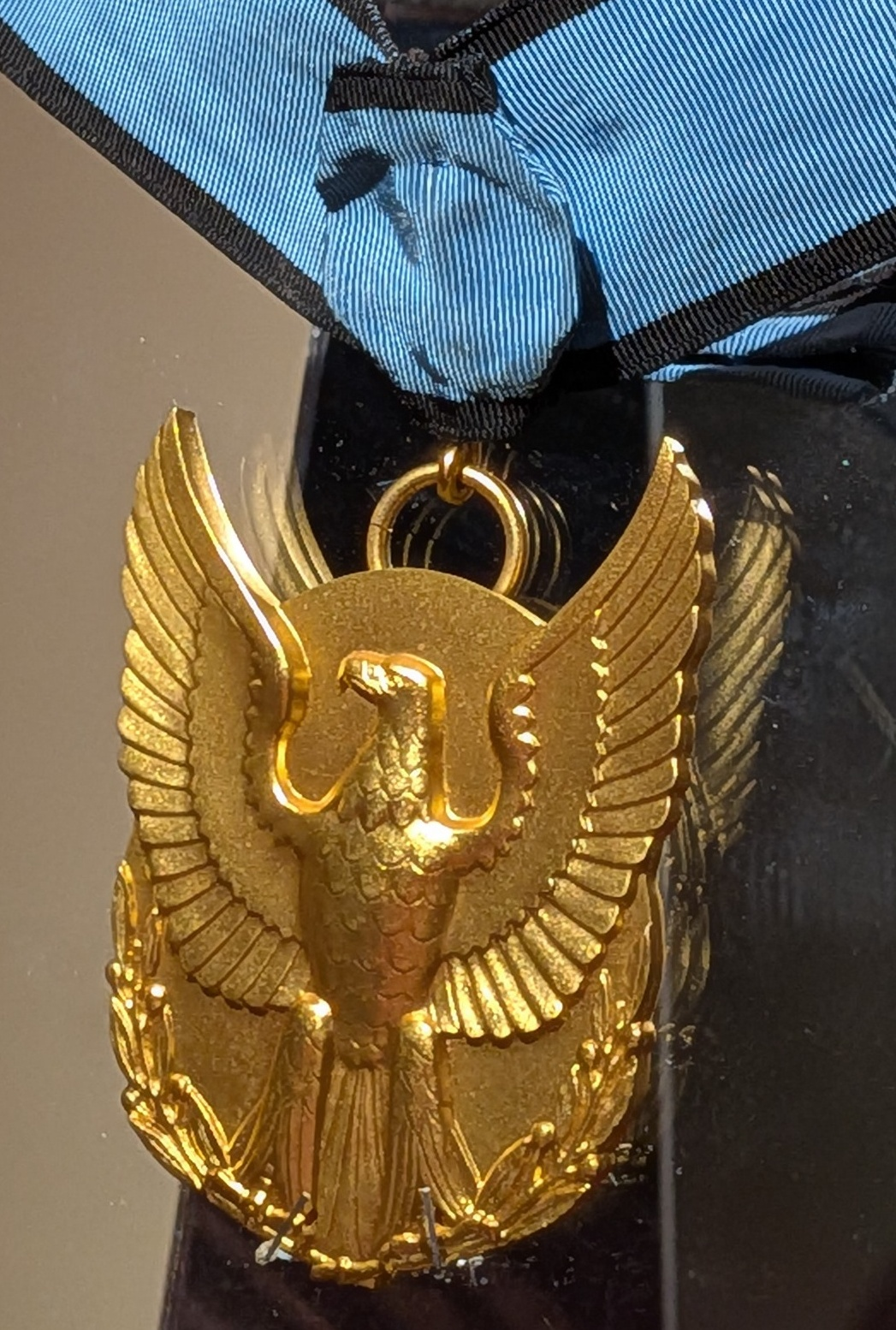
- The Four Chaplains' Medal posthumously awarded to John P. Washington
- Type: Military medal
- Awarded for: Extraordinary heroism
- Country: United States
- Presented by: Secretary of the Army; 86th United States Congress
- Status: Inactive
- Established: July 14, 1960; 66 years ago
- First award: January 18, 1961
- Final award: January 18, 1961
- Awarded to: George L. Fox; Alexander D. Goode; Clark V. Poling; John P. Washington

Highlights
- Total: 4 (posthumously)

The Four Chaplains' Medal is a decoration approved by an Act of Congress on July 14, 1960 (P.L. 86-656, 74 Stat. 521). The decoration recognizes the heroic actions of four United States Army chaplains during World War II. No other use of the medal has been authorized.

Also known as the Chaplain's Medal of Honor and the Chaplain's Medal for Heroism, its design commemorates the actions of the Four Chaplains who gave their lives in the line of duty on February 3, 1943. The medal was designed by Thomas Hudson Jones (1892–1969) of the United States Army Institute of Heraldry. It was presented posthumously to their next of kin by Secretary of the Army Wilber M. Brucker at Fort Myer, Virginia, on January 18, 1961.

== The Four Chaplains ==
The four chaplains were lieutenants in the United States Army: the Rev. George L. Fox (Methodist), Rabbi Alexander D. Goode (Jewish), the Rev. Clark V. Poling (Reformed Church in America) and Fr. John P. Washington (Roman Catholic). In late 1942, the chaplains were transferred to Camp Myles Standish in Taunton, Massachusetts, and attended Chaplains School at Harvard University. In January 1943, the chaplains embarked on board the SS Dorchester, which was transporting over 900 soldiers to the United Kingdom via Greenland.

On February 2, 1943, the German submarine U-223 spotted the convoy on the move and closed with the ships, firing a torpedo which struck the Dorchester shortly after midnight. Hundreds of men packed the decks of the rapidly sinking ship and scrambled for the lifeboats. Several of the lifeboats had been damaged and the four chaplains began to organize frightened soldiers. They distributed life jackets from a locker; when the supply of life jackets ran out, each of the chaplains gave theirs to other soldiers. When the last lifeboats were away, the chaplains prayed with those unable to escape the sinking ship. Twenty-seven minutes after the torpedo struck, the Dorchester disappeared below the waves with 672 men still aboard. The last anyone saw of the four chaplains, they were standing on the deck, arms linked and praying together.

As to official military decorations, each of the four chaplains was posthumously awarded the Distinguished Service Cross and the Purple Heart.

== Award creation ==
In 1957, The American Legion, at their 39th National Convention in Atlantic City, passed a resolution asking Congress to award the Medal of Honor to the Four Chaplains; however, criteria for the Medal of Honor included "combat with the enemy." The special medal — intended to have the same weight and importance as the Medal of Honor — was approved by the Senate in 1958, and by the House in 1960. In 2006, The American Legion, at their 88th National Convention in Salt Lake City, passed a new resolution in support of awarding the Medal of Honor to the Four Chaplains.

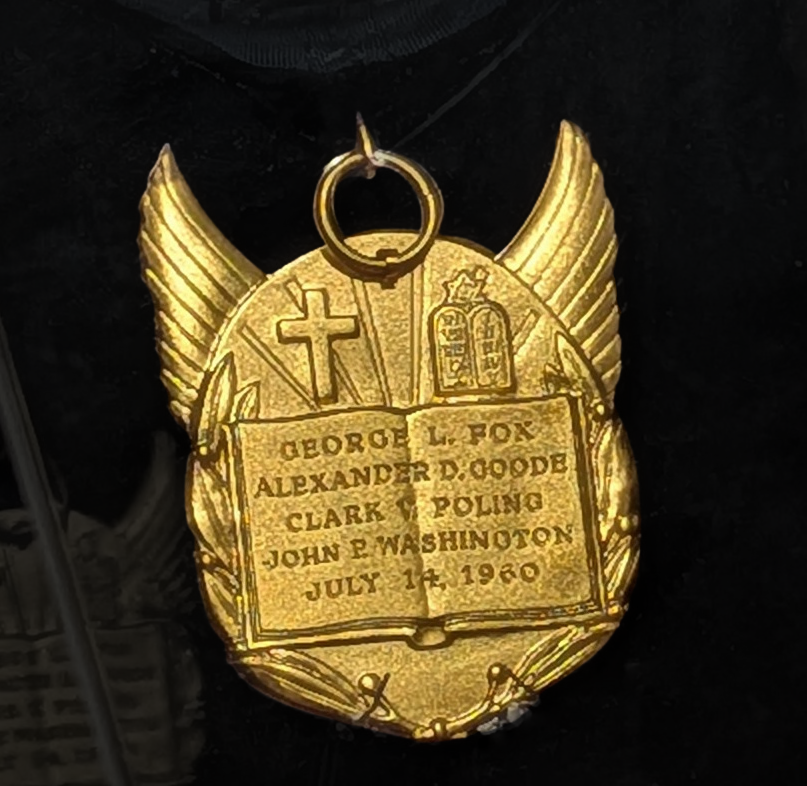
The rear of the medal

The statute awarding the medal is listed as follows:

Be it enacted by the Senate and House of Representatives of the United States of America in Congress assembled, That the President is authorized to award posthumously appropriate medals and certificates to Chaplain George L. Fox of Gilman, Vermont; Chaplain Alexander D. Goode of Washington, District of Columbia; Chaplain Clark V. Poling of Schenectady, New York; and Chaplain John P. Washington of Arlington, New Jersey, in recognition of the extraordinary heroism displayed by them when they sacrificed their lives in the sinking of the troop transport Dorchester in the North Atlantic in 1943 by giving up their life preservers to other men aboard such transport. The medals and certificates authorized by this Act shall be in such form and of such design as shall be prescribed by the President, and shall be awarded to such representatives of the aforementioned chaplains as the President may designate.

Washington's medal is on display at the U.S. Army Institute for Religious Leadership.

== See also ==
- United States military chaplains
- Awards and decorations of the United States military
