= First Reformed Church of Schenectady =

Coordinates: 42.81698°N 73.946975°W

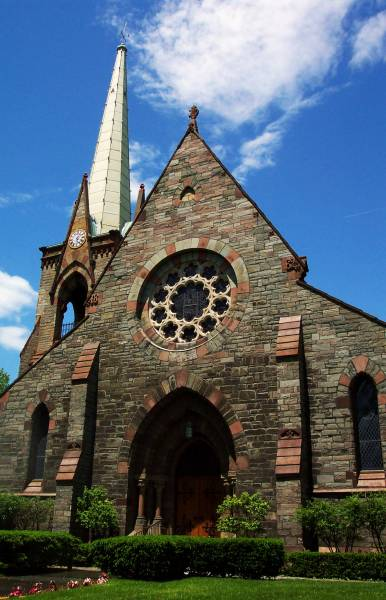
First Reformed Church of Schenectady

First Reformed Church of Schenectady is located at 8 North Church Street in the Historic Stockade District of Schenectady, New York and is a member of the Reformed Church in America. The church was first organized in 1680 by Dutch settlers and was the first church established in the Mohawk Valley. The church, along with the Stockade District were added to the National Register of Historic Places in 1973 and again with a boundary increase in 1984 (#73001267).

== History ==
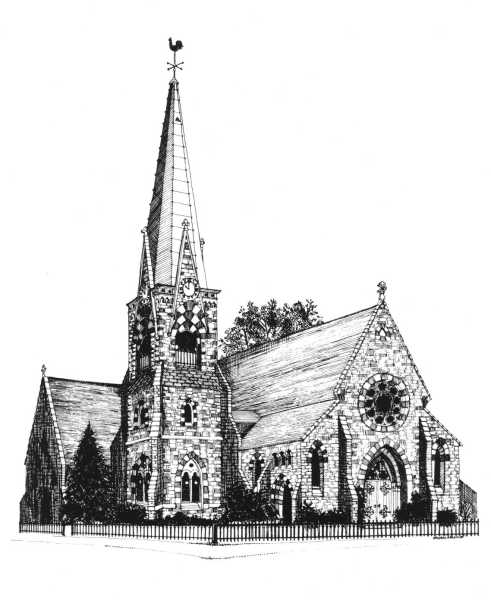
On the corner of Church and Union Streets

The first Dutch Reformed church in Schenectady was built about 1682 on the public square of the stockade at what is now known as the intersection of State, Church, and Railroad Streets. The church building was destroyed by fire during the Schenectady Massacre on the night of February 8, 1690. An Indian war party from Montreal killed sixty villagers including the church minister, Dominie Petrus Tessemacher (Tessachmaecher). Domine Tessemacher was called to Schenectady from the church at Bergen, New Netherland, and was the first minister in the denomination to have been ordained in the new world.

At the beginning of the Eighteenth Century the church was known as the Reformed Nether Dutch Church, and in 1727 it was changed to Nether Dutch Reformed Church. By the time the congregation occupied its third edifice it has received a charter from King George II in 1734, which allowed the church to operate independently under the name of First Reformed Protestant Dutch Church.

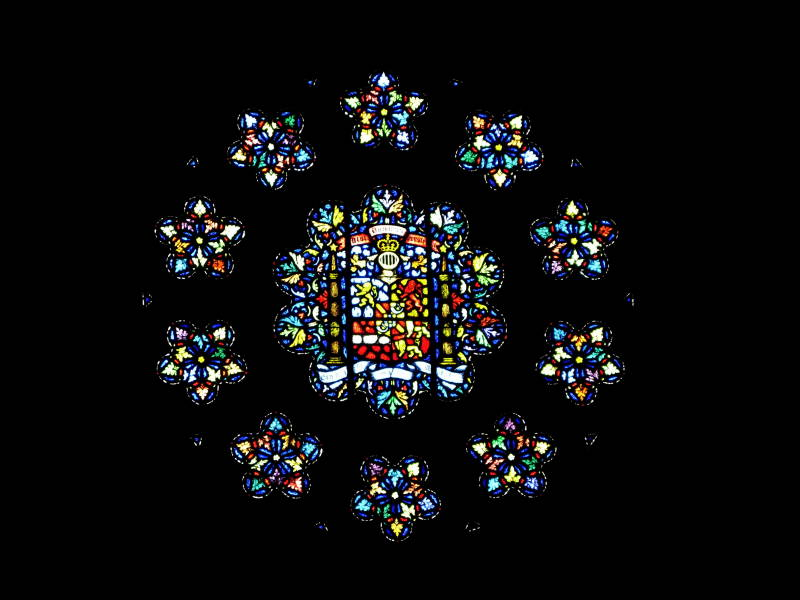
Stained glass rose window

The second building, located on the same site as the first, was occupied from 1702-1734. Funds for this building were raised from an appeal to Governor John Nanfan to petition for contributions throughout the Province of New York. After thirty years, the size of the congregation, including Indian communicants, had outgrown the seating capacity of the church. For some time after its disuse in 1734 the building was used as a fort. By 1754, it had been removed from the site.

The third building was located in the middle of what is now the intersection of Union and Church Streets. This building was used from 1734 to 1814. It measured 56 by 80 feet and according to the Dutch custom, men and women worshiped sitting separately. Indians and slaves occupied the balcony. On this building was the chanticleer clock tower and belfry, topped by the cock of St. Nicholas on a weathervane, all modeled after the pattern set in the Netherlands. In the belfry was a 600 pound silver bell, which was cast in Amsterdam in 1732. Contributions of silver coin and plate, donated by the Reformed Church members in Amsterdam, Holland, as a mission contribution, were melted down into the bell. The bell tolled for 116 years until it cracked in 1848. Because of disrepair of the building and the growing congregation, in 1812 the Consistory resolved to sell the sites of the first three churches to the city of Schenectady for 200 acres of land.

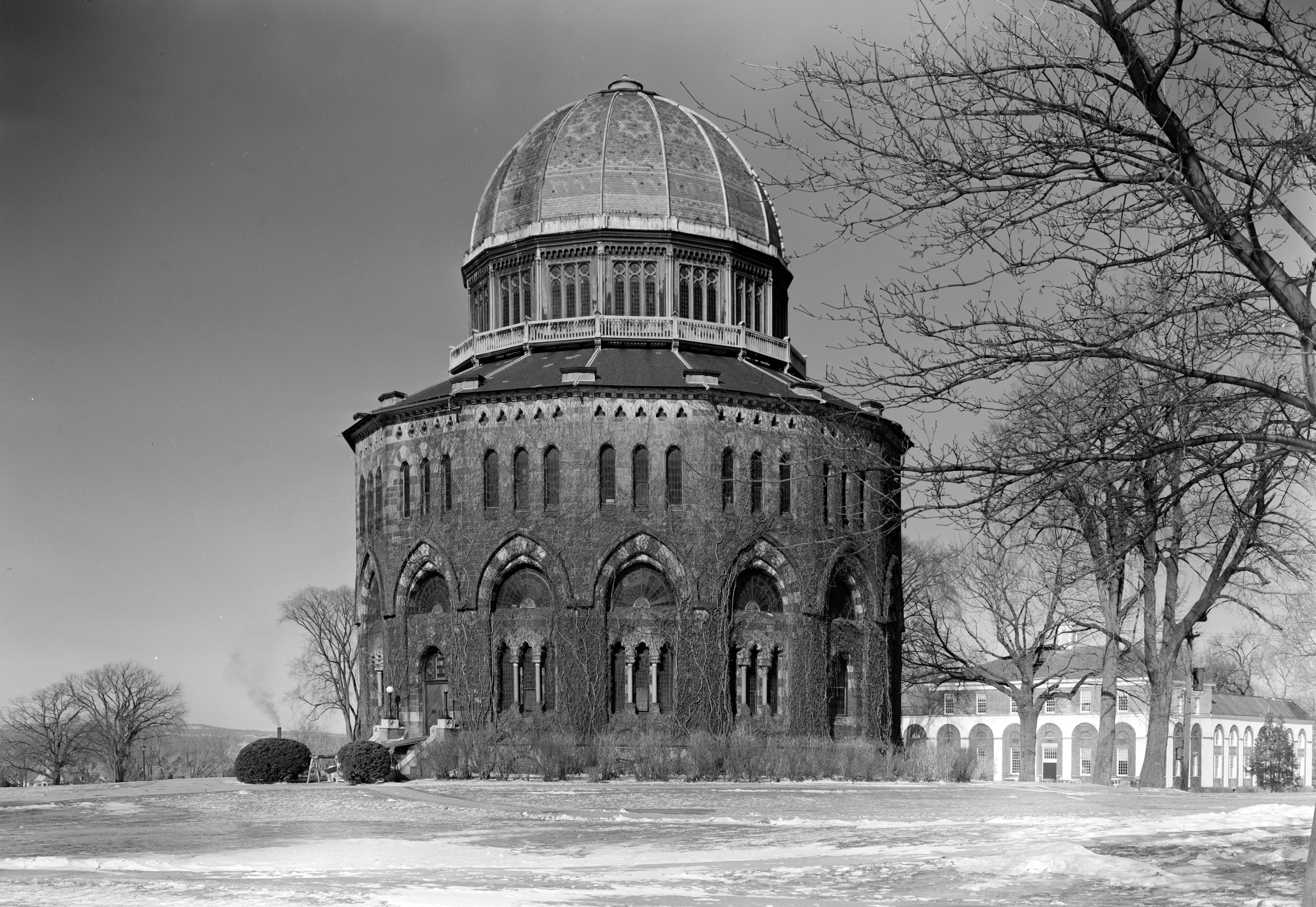
Edward Tuckerman Potter is the same architect of the Nott Memorial at Union College

The fourth building was constructed on the northeast corner of Church and Union Streets, very near the current location of the church. This building housed the congregation from 1814 to 1861. During this time, the church fathers achieved incorporation and the name was again changed to Reformed Protestant Dutch Church of Schenectady. The building was a plain brick church built with a bell tower and cupola. No longer were worshipers separated by sex, but rather families were allowed to sit together. Pews were rented on a yearly basis and pew position was determined by the renters' status. The first church organ was installed in 1826. The building narrowly escaped a neighborhood fire in 1819, but in 1861 was consumed by a fire which destroyed much of the city also.

The fifth building was built in 1863, on the same site occupied by the fourth. By 1867 the church became known as the First Reformed Church. The architectural landmark building was designed by Victorian-gothic architect Edward Tuckerman Potter. This building was hit by a fire on Sunday, February 1, 1948. The fire began at 4:45 p.m. and continued through the night destroying the entire structure except for three of the exterior walls, which would be the basis for the current structure. The congregation, with generous assistance from the Schenectady community, restored the edifice to its present form.

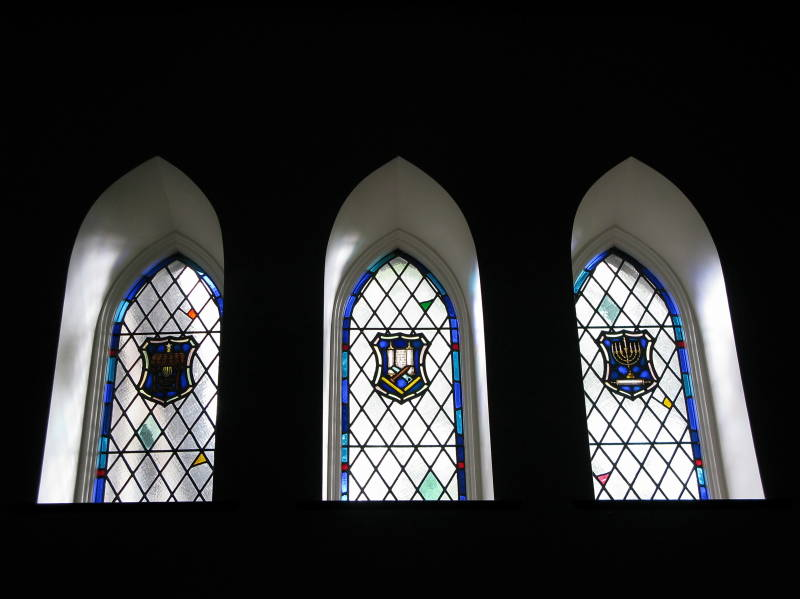
An example of the beautiful stained glass in the sanctuary

The sixth, and present, building was built in 1950. It was built on the foundation of the fifth building. The three stone walls left standing after the fire were reinforced. The north wall was torn down and the sanctuary was extended twenty feet. To complete the church, an 82 foot spire was hoisted into place on November 20, 1969. Placed atop the spire are a weathervane and chanticleer. Funds for the steeple came from personal contributions and memorial bequests.

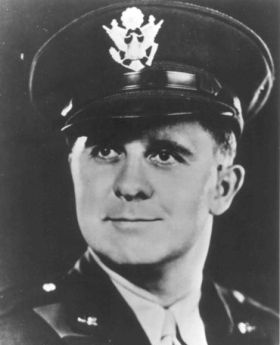
Clark V. Poling

== Notable Members ==
- Henry Glen, first Town Clerk of Schenectady (1767-1809), member of New York Provincial Congress and New York State Assembly, New York Militia and Continental Army officer in American Revolution, member of United States House of Representatives, 1793-1801
- George R. Lunn left the pulpit of First Reformed to become Schenectady's Socialist mayor in the early 1900s and later went on to become the Lt. Governor of the State of New York as a Democrat.
- Dirck Romeyn and the consistory founded the Schenectady Academy in 1785. This was one of the foundational institutions that would eventually become Union College, established in 1795.
- Clark V. Poling was one of the Four Chaplains who died during WWII, during the sinking of the troop transport Dorchester on February 3, 1943, by giving up their life jackets so other soldiers would survive.

== Beliefs ==
In addition to the confessional standards of unity held in common by the Reformed Church in America (the Belgic Confession, Heidelberg Catechism, Canons of Dort, and Belhar Confession), First Reformed Church of Schenectady adopted the following covenant in 1962:

We do hereby set forth the principles of the Christian faith as commonly held among us, believing that no other foundation can anyone lay than that which is laid, which is Jesus Christ. It shall be our aim to bring joy to little children, instruction and high ideals to youth, inspiration to men and women in the midst of life, and comfort to those in life's later years; and to labor together for the betterment of humankind. Our fellowship shall not be dependent upon identity of theological opinion, or of outward circumstance, or of denominational concern, but shall grow from a common loyalty to Jesus, a common commitment to serve the world we touch, and a common purpose to do justly, to love kindness, and to walk humbly with God. Our ideal is a church of the open mind, the warm heart, the hopeful spirit, and the social vision which ever seeks to express, in all walks of life, the mind of Jesus.

== Ministers of the Church ==
Senior Pastor	Dates	Associate Pastor	Dates
Petrus Tessemacher	1684-90	Godfridius Dellius	1694-98
Bernardus Freeman	1700-05	Johannes Lydius	1705-09
Thomas Brower	1714-28	Henry Barclay	1710-15
Reinhardt Erickzon	1728-36		
Cornelius Van Santvoord	1740-52		
Barent Vrooman	1754-84		
Dirck Romeyn	1784-1804	Jacob Sickles	1795-97
Jacob H. Meier	1803-06		
Cornelius Bogardus	1808-12		
Jacob Van Vechten	1815-49		
William J.R. Taylor	1849-52		
Julius Hawley Seelye	1853-58		
Edward Eli Seelye	1858-64		
Denis Wortman	1865-70	Andrew Raymond	1899-1900
Ashbel G. Vermilye	1871-76	Leonard A. Sibley Jr.	1948-51
William E. Griffis	1877-86	David W. Jenks	1952-54
Albert C. Sewall	1886-99	Ralph Garcia	1954-56
John S. Zelie	1901-03	Donald A. Boulton	1956-59
George R. Lunn	1904-09	Lloyd Dunham	1960-62
Clayton J. Potter	1910-37	Stanley Y.K. Yin	1963-67
Clark V. Poling	1938-43	Ronald LaRose	1967-68
Bertram deH. Atwood	1943-53	Cornelius Van Leeuwen	1967-74
Edwin D. McLane	1954-60	David P. Risseeuw	1974-87
J. Dean Dykstra	1960-84		
Albert A. Smith	1968-1990	Johan Bosman	1999-2004
Robert White	1992-2006	Justin Myers	2003-2007
		Daniel Carlson	2005–2024
William H. Levering	2007–2020	Stacey Midge	2008–2017
M G Martell Spagnolo	2023-2024		
