= Lewis Miller (folk artist) =

American artist (1796–1882)

Lewis Miller (May 3, 1796 – September 15, 1882) was a Pennsylvania Dutch folk artist, noted for his watercolors of historical and everyday events.

Miller was born in York, Pennsylvania. A carpenter by trade, he kept several journals throughout his life which he filled with simple watercolors, richly embedded with text and captions chronicling life in the early and mid-19th century. His work is most notable for its depiction of life of ordinary people in rural Pennsylvania Dutch country. It is of special interest to historians for its depictions of everyday life and insight into local culture and customs.

He spent most of his life in and near York, but also traveled to Europe (including Württemberg and the upper Rhine near where his parents had been born) and later in life frequently visited Christiansburg, Virginia, drawing and capturing scenes and events for posterity. He drew a series of watercolors depicting scenes in York during the American Civil War, including several related to the Gettysburg campaign and the Battle of Hanover.

Miller's works today can be found in the Abby Aldrich Rockefeller Folk Art Museum at Colonial Williamsburg in Virginia; the York County History Center in York, Pennsylvania; Montgomery Museum in Christiansburg, Virginia; and at the Virginia Historical Society in Richmond, Virginia. Sixteen mini-murals in York are based on drawings from Miller's journals.
