= Four Chaplains =

American chaplains killed in WWII

The Four Chaplains

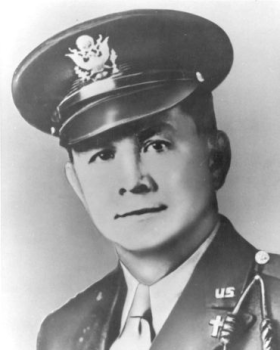
George L. Fox

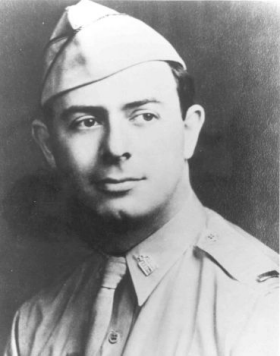
Alexander D. Goode

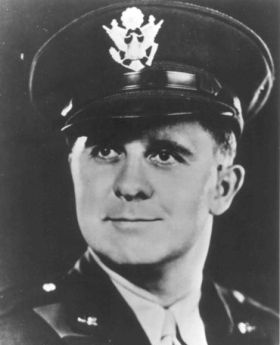
Clark V. Poling

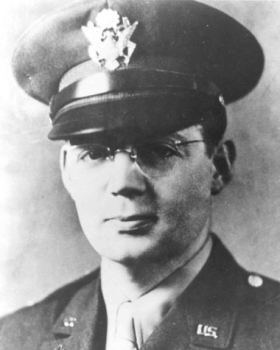
John P. Washington

The Four Chaplains, also referred to as the Immortal Chaplains or the Dorchester Chaplains, were four chaplains who died rescuing civilian and military personnel as the American troop ship SS Dorchester sank on February 3, 1943, in what has been referred to as one of the worst single loss of American personnel in convoys during World War II.

The Dorchester, a civilian liner, had been converted for military service in World War II as a troop transport of the War Shipping Administration. The ship left New York on January 23, 1943, en route to Greenland, carrying approximately 900 as part of a convoy of three ships escorted by Coast Guard Cutters Tampa, Escanaba, and Comanche. During the early morning hours of February 3, the vessel was torpedoed by the German submarine U-223 off Newfoundland in the North Atlantic. The chaplains helped the other soldiers board lifeboats and gave up their own life jackets when the supply ran out. The chaplains joined arms, said prayers, and sang hymns as they went down with the ship.

The impact of the chaplains' story was deep, with many memorials and extensive coverage in the media. Each of the four chaplains was posthumously awarded the Distinguished Service Cross and the Purple Heart. The chaplains were nominated for the Medal of Honor, but were ineligible as they had not engaged in combat with the enemy. Instead, Congress created a medal for them – Four Chaplains' Medal – with the same weight and importance as the Medal of Honor.

== The chaplains ==
The relatively new chaplains all held the rank of first lieutenant. They included Methodist minister the Reverend George L. Fox, Reform Rabbi Alexander D. Goode, PhD, Catholic priest Father John P. Washington, and Reformed Church in America minister the Reverend Clark V. Poling. Their backgrounds, personalities, and denominations were different, although Goode, Poling and Washington had all served as leaders in the Boy Scouts of America. They met at the Army Chaplains School at Harvard University, where they prepared for assignments in the European theater, sailing on board Dorchester to report to their new assignments.

=== George Lansing Fox ===
George L. Fox was born March 15, 1900, in Lewistown, Pennsylvania, the eldest of eight children. When he was 17, he left school and lied about his age in order to join the Army to serve in World War I. He joined the ambulance corps in 1917, assigned to Camp Newton D. Baker in Texas. On December 3, 1917, George embarked from Camp Merritt, New Jersey, and boarded the USS Huron en route to France. As a medical corps assistant, he was highly decorated for bravery and was awarded the Silver Star, Purple Heart and the French Croix de Guerre.

Upon his discharge, he returned home to Altoona, where he completed high school. He entered Moody Bible Institute in Illinois in 1923. He and Isadora G. Hurlbut of Vermont were married in 1923, when he began his religious career as an itinerant preacher in the Methodist faith. He later graduated from Illinois Wesleyan University in Bloomington, served as a student pupil in Rye, New Hampshire, and then studied at the Boston University School of Theology, where he was ordained a Methodist minister on June 10, 1934. He served parishes in Thetford, Union Village, and Gilman, Vermont, and was appointed state chaplain and historian for the American Legion in Vermont.

In 1942, Fox volunteered to serve as an Army chaplain, accepting his appointment July 24, 1942. He began active duty on August 8, 1942, the same day his son Wyatt enlisted in the Marine Corps. After Army Chaplains School at Harvard, he reported to the 411th Coast Artillery Battalion at Camp Davis. He was then reunited with Chaplains Goode, Poling and Washington at Camp Myles Standish in Taunton, Massachusetts, where they prepared to depart for Europe on board the Dorchester.

=== Alexander David Goode ===
Reform Rabbi Alexander D. Goode (PhD) was born in Brooklyn, New York, on May 10, 1911, the son of Rabbi Hyman Goodekowitz. He was raised in Washington, D.C., attending Eastern High School, eventually deciding to follow his father's footsteps by studying for the rabbinate at Hebrew Union College (HUC), where he graduated with a B.H. degree in 1937. He later received his PhD from Johns Hopkins University in 1940. While studying for the rabbinate at HUC, he worked at the Washington Hebrew Congregation during summer breaks.

He originally applied to become a Navy chaplain in January 1941, but was not accepted. After the attack on Pearl Harbor in 1941, he applied to the Army, receiving his appointment as a chaplain on July 21, 1942. Chaplain Goode went on active duty on August 9, 1942, and was selected for the Chaplains School at Harvard. Chaplain Goode was then assigned to the 333rd Fighter Squadron in Goldsboro, North Carolina. In October 1942, he was transferred to Camp Myles Standish in Taunton, Massachusetts, and reunited with Chaplains Fox, Poling and Washington, who had been among his classmates at Harvard.

=== Clark Vandersall Poling ===
Clark V. Poling was born August 7, 1910, in Columbus, Ohio, the son of evangelical minister Daniel A. Poling, who was rebaptized in 1936 as a Baptist minister. Clark Poling first studied at Oakwood School in Poughkeepsie, New York and later at Yale University's Divinity School in New Haven, Connecticut and graduated with his B.D. degree in 1936. He was ordained in the Reformed Church in America, and served first in the First Church of Christ, New London, Connecticut, and then as pastor of the First Reformed Church, in Schenectady, New York. He married Betty Jung.

With the outbreak of World War II, Poling decided to enter the Army, wanting to face the same danger as others. His father, who had served as a World War I chaplain, told him chaplains risk and give their lives, too—and with that knowledge, he applied to serve as an Army chaplain, accepting an appointment on June 10, 1942, as a chaplain with the 131st Quartermaster Truck Regiment, reporting to Camp Shelby, Hattiesburg, Mississippi, on June 25. Later he reported to Army Chaplains School at Harvard, where he met Chaplains Fox, Goode, and Washington. Clark V. Poling's father, Daniel A. Poling was pastor of Grace Baptist Church of Philadelphia when the Dorchester was sunk. The church had been planning a memorial for its well-known pastor Russell Conwell but decided to put all efforts towards creating the Chapel of the Four Chaplains in the basement of the church instead.

=== John Patrick Washington ===
John P. Washington was born in Newark, New Jersey, on July 18, 1908. He studied at Seton Hall, in South Orange, New Jersey, to complete his high school and college courses in preparation for the Catholic priesthood. He graduated in 1931 with an A.B., entering Immaculate Conception Seminary in Darlington, New Jersey, where he received his minor orders on May 26, 1933. He served as a subdeacon at all the Solemn Masses and later became a deacon on December 25, 1934. He was elected prefect of his class and was ordained a priest on June 15, 1935.

Father Washington's first parish was at St. Genevieve's, in Elizabeth, New Jersey. He later served at St. Venantius for a year. In 1938, he was assigned to St. Stephen's in Kearny, New Jersey. Shortly after the Pearl Harbor attack of December 7, 1941, he received his appointment as a chaplain in the United States Army, reporting for active duty on May 9, 1942. He was named chief of the Chaplains' Reserve Pool, in Ft. Benjamin Harrison, Indiana, and in June 1942, he was assigned to the 76th Infantry Division in Ft. George Meade, Maryland. In November 1942, he reported to Camp Myles Standish in Taunton, Massachusetts, and met Chaplains Fox, Goode and Poling at Chaplains School at Harvard.

== The ship and its sinking ==
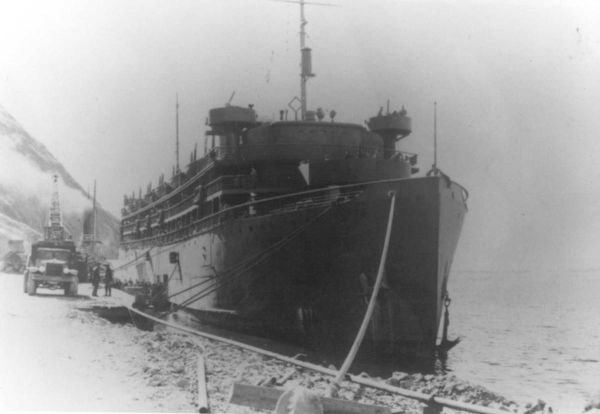
Undated photograph of the U.S. Army transport ship Dorchester.

The Dorchester had been a 5,649 ton civilian liner, 368 feet long with a 52-foot beam and a single funnel, originally built in 1926 by Newport News Shipbuilding and Dry Dock Company, for the Merchants and Miners Line, operating ships from Baltimore to Florida, carrying both freight and passengers. It was the third of four liners built for the Line.

The ship was converted for military service in World War II as a War Shipping Administration troop transport operated by Atlantic, Gulf & West Indies Steamship Lines (Agwilines) allocated to United States Army requirements. The conversion was done in New York by the Atlantic, Gulf, and West Indies (AGWI) SS Company, and included additional lifeboats and liferafts; guns (a 3-inch gun forward, a 4-inch gun aft, and four 20 mm guns); and changes to the large windows in the pilot house so that they would be reduced to slits to afford more protection.

Designed for 314 civilian passengers and 90 crew, she was able to carry slightly more than 900 military passengers and crew.

Dorchester left New York on January 23, 1943, en route to Greenland, carrying the four chaplains and approximately 900 others, as part of a convoy of three ships (SG-19 convoy). Most of the military personnel were not told the ship's ultimate destination. The convoy was escorted by Coast Guard Cutters Tampa, Escanaba, and Comanche.

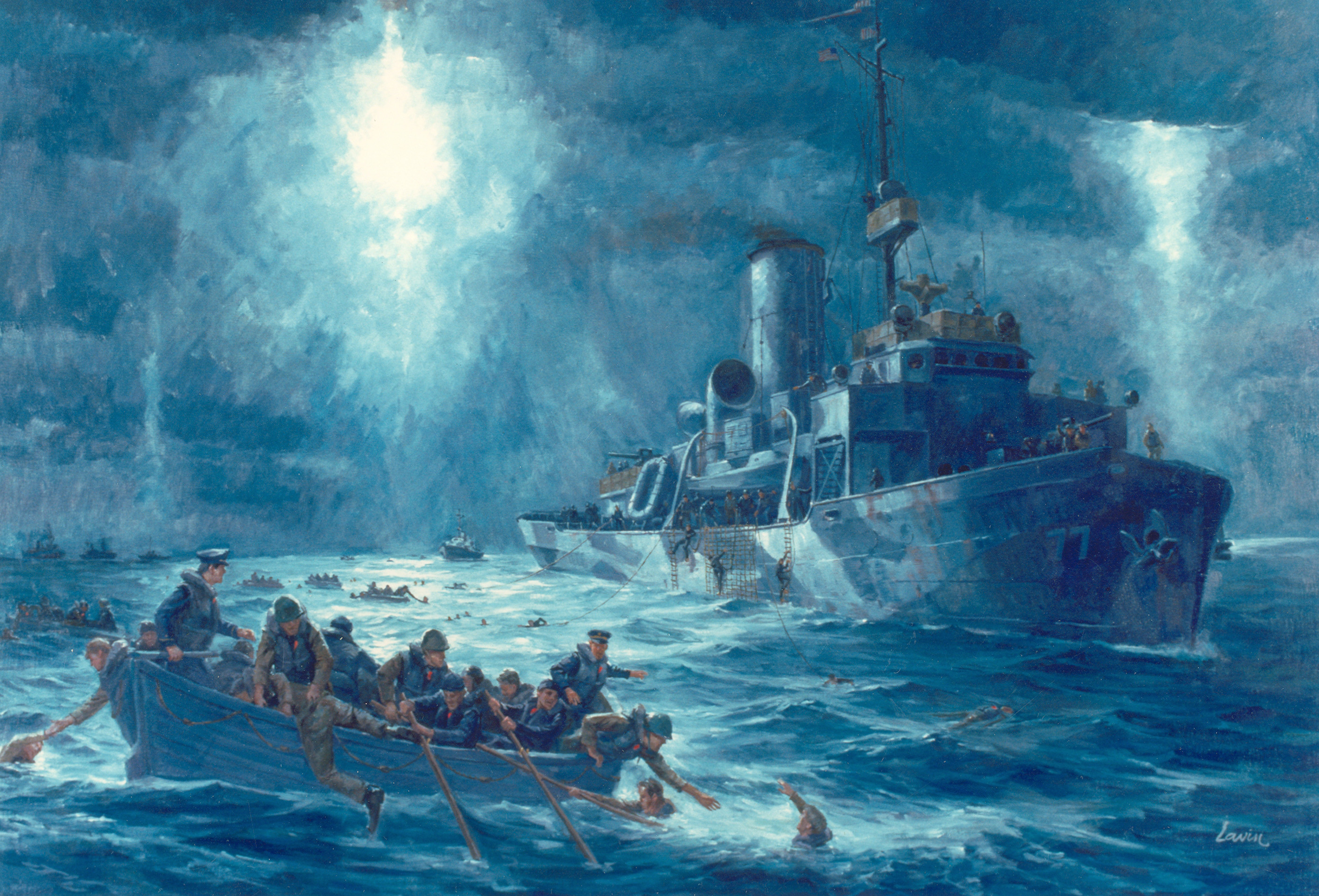
History painting of Coast Guard Cutter USCGC Escanaba during the rescue of survivors of the sunken Dorchester.

The ship's captain, Hans J. Danielsen, had been alerted that Coast Guard sonar had detected a submarine. Because German U-boats were monitoring sea lanes and had attacked and sunk ships earlier during the war, Captain Danielsen had the ship's crew on a state of high alert even before he received that information, ordering the men to sleep in their clothing and keep their life jackets on. "Many soldiers sleeping deep in the ship's hold disregarded the order because of the engine's heat. Others ignored it because the life jackets were uncomfortable."

During the early morning hours of February 3, 1943, at 12:55 am, the vessel was torpedoed by the German submarine U-223 off Newfoundland in the North Atlantic.

The torpedo knocked out the Dorchester's electrical system, leaving the ship dark. Panic set in among the men on board, many of them trapped below decks. The chaplains sought to calm the men and organize an orderly evacuation of the ship, and helped guide wounded men to safety. As life jackets were passed out to the men, the supply ran out before each man had one. The chaplains removed their own life jackets and gave them to others. They helped as many men as they could into lifeboats, and then linked arms and, saying prayers and singing hymns, went down with the ship.

As I swam away from the ship, I looked back. The flares had lighted everything. The bow came up high and she slid under. The last thing I saw, the Four Chaplains were up there praying for the safety of the men. They had done everything they could. I did not see them again. They themselves did not have a chance without their life jackets.

— Grady Clark, survivor

According to some reports, survivors could hear different languages mixed in the prayers of the chaplains, including Jewish prayers in Hebrew and Catholic prayers in Latin. Only 230 of the 904 men aboard the ship were rescued. Life jackets offered little protection from hypothermia, which killed most men in the water. The water temperature was 34 °F (1 °C) and the air temperature was 36 °F (2 °C). By the time additional rescue ships arrived, "hundreds of dead bodies were seen floating on the water, kept up by their life jackets."

== Cultural impact ==
=== In film ===
- The 60-minute TV documentary The Four Chaplains: Sacrifice at Sea was produced in 2004.
- In 2008 development of a movie based on the chaplains' story, titled Lifeboat 13, was announced. As of 2022, no further information had been released about the project.

=== In print ===
- Francis Beauchesne Thornton (1953). Sea of Glory: The Magnificent Story of the Four Chaplains. Prentice Hall. LCCN 52010662. OCLC 1349281.
- Dan Kurzman (2004). No Greater Glory: The Four Immortal Chaplains and the Sinking of the Dorchester in World War II. Random House. ISBN 978-0375508776. OCLC 53019525.
- Wales, Ken; Poling, David (2006). Sea of Glory: Based on the True WW II Story of the Four Chaplains and the U.S.A.T. Dorchester. B&H Publishing Group. ISBN 978-0805443806 – via Google Books. "As the title indicates, it is 'based on' the story, not an actual factual account."
- "Chaplains at War". The Living Bible (comic). No. 3. March 1946.
- Edgar A. Guest (1949). "Four Men of God". Living the Years. Reilly & Lee Company.
- Chester Szymczak (1956). When Time Stood Still: The S.S. Dorchester's Last Heroic Night. Dorrance & Company, Inc. LCCN 56-11555.
- Chester J. Szymczak (1976). The Men The Ship: The Famous Four Chaplains Story And The Sinking Of The Dorchester. Great Lakes Publishing Co., Inc. LCCN 76-11392.

=== In music ===
- A composition entitled "The Light Eternal", written by James Swearingen in 1992, tells the story of the Four Chaplains through music.
- "The Ballad of the Four Chaplains" was written and performed by the bluegrass band Dead Men's Hollow.

=== In art ===
In addition to the stained glass windows recalling the chaplains and their heroism, paintings include:

- Four Chaplains, 1943, by Alton Tobey
- A Moment of Peace, Ft. Jackson, South Carolina, painted by Steven Carter.
- The Four Chaplains, Chapel of Four Chaplains.
- The Four Chaplains, by Art Seidan (the four, pictured at the rail of the ship).
- Four Chaplains Mural, by artist Connie Burns Watkins, commissioned by the Rotary Club of York, Pennsylvania.
- Four Chaplains Mural, painted by Dean Fausett, at entrance to Joseph "Ziggy" Kahn Gymnasium, Jewish Community Center Irene Kaufman Building, Squirrel Hill, Pennsylvania.
- Four Chaplains Mural, painted by Connie Burns Watkins, in York, Pennsylvania.
- Four Chaplains Mural, painted by Nils Hogner, at the Chapel of Four Chaplains
- Four Chaplains Monument and Eternal Flame, Riverview Park, Sebastian Florida

=== Other ===
- The two-hour audio documentary No Greater Love tells the story, including interviews with survivors, rescuers, and naval historians.
- The 23rd degree conferred by the Ancient Accepted Scottish Rite Northern Masonic Jurisdiction, entitled "Knight of Valor" tells the story of the Four Chaplains as a lesson of personal sacrifice to aid one's fellow man.

== Remembrance ==
=== Awards ===
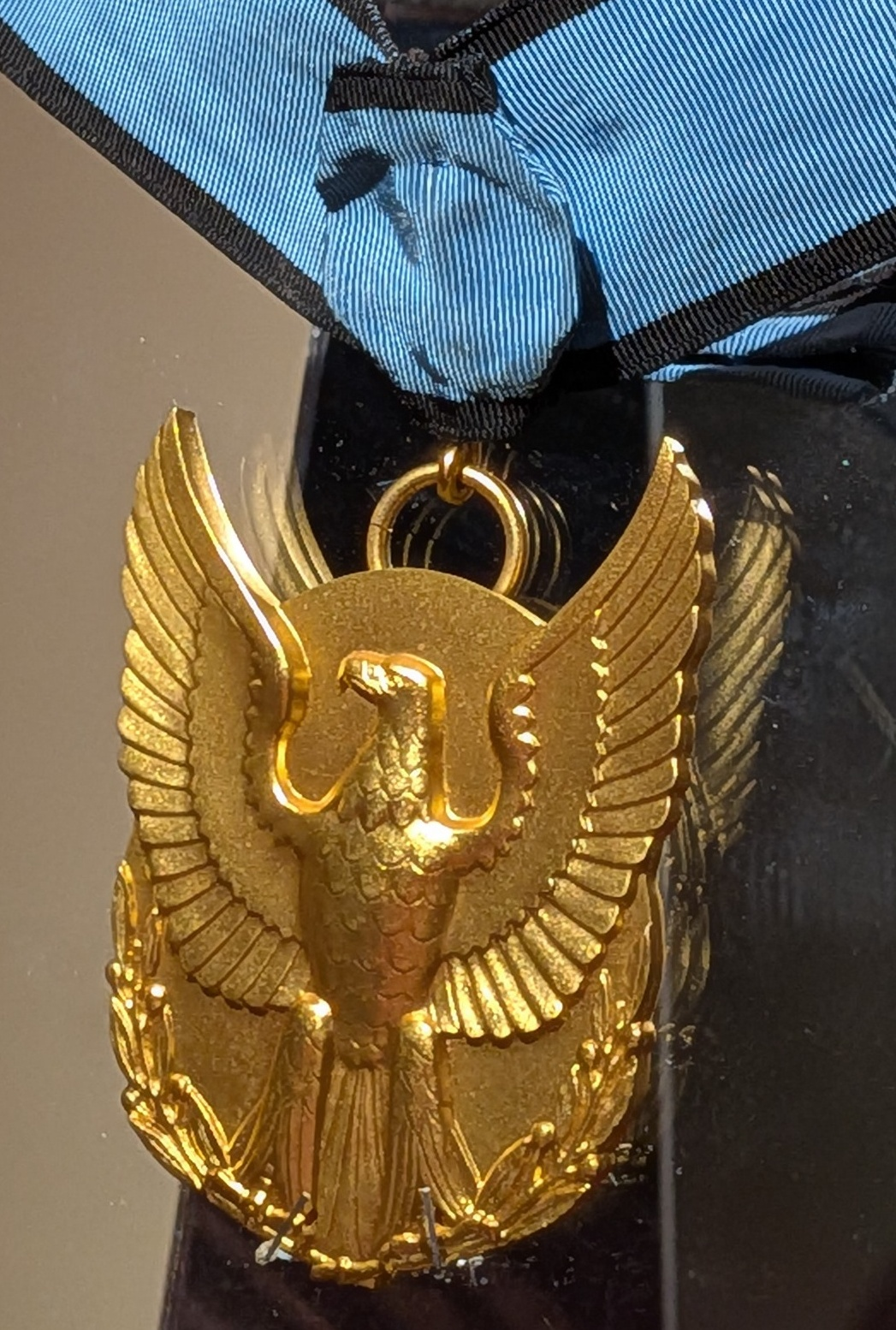
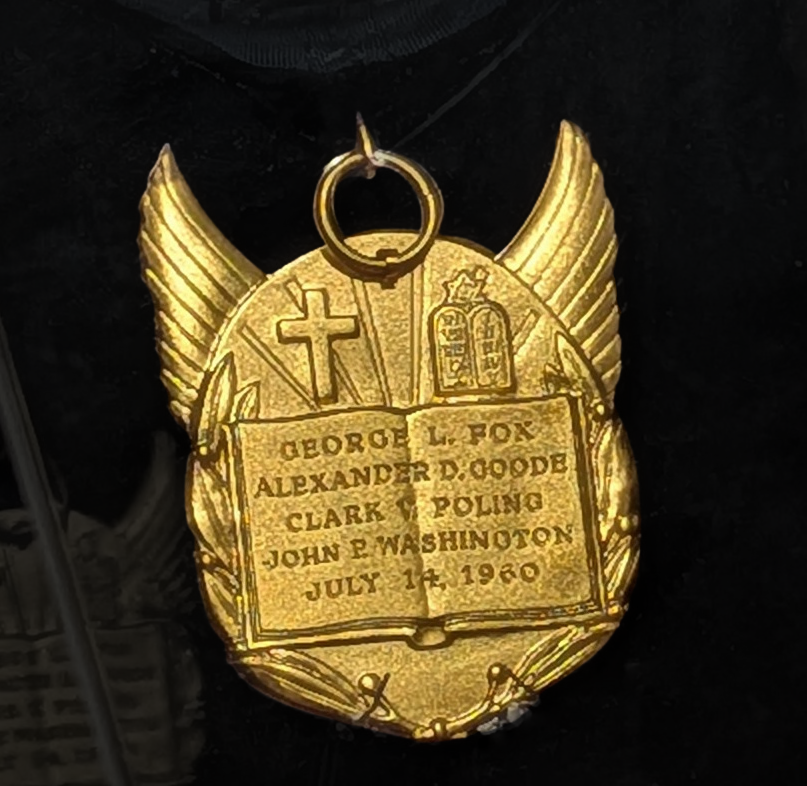
John Washington's Four Chaplains' Medal on display at the U.S. Army Institute for Religious Leadership

On December 19, 1944, all four chaplains were posthumously awarded the Purple Heart and the Distinguished Service Cross.

Additionally, members of Congress later authorized a special medal, the Four Chaplains' Medal, approved by a unanimous act of Congress on July 14, 1960, through Public Law 86-656. The medals were presented posthumously to the next of kin of each of the four chaplains by Secretary of the Army Wilber M. Brucker at Fort Myer, Virginia, on January 18, 1961.

=== Four Chaplains Day ===
Ceremonies and services are held each year on or around the February 3 Four Chaplains Day by numerous military and civilian groups and organizations. In 1998, February 3 of that year was established by senate resolution 169–98 as Four Chaplains Day to commemorate the 55th anniversary of the sinking of United States Army transport Dorchester and subsequent heroism of these men. Some state or city officials commemorate the day with official proclamations, sometimes including the order that flags fly at half-mast in memory of the fallen chaplains. In some cases, official proclamations establish observances at other times: for example, North Dakota legislation requests that the governor issue an annual proclamation establishing the first Sunday in February as Four Chaplains Sunday.

Civitan International, a worldwide volunteer association of service clubs, holds an interfaith Clergy Appreciation Week every year. The event honors the sacrifice of the Four Chaplains by encouraging citizens to thank the clergy that serve their communities. The First Parish Church (Unitarian Universalist) in Dorchester, Massachusetts, hosts an ecumenical Service of the Four Chaplains each January. The American Legion commemorates the day through services and programs at many posts throughout the nation.

On February 14, 2002, as part of the annual award of the Immortal Chaplains Prize for Humanity, a special reconciliation meeting took place between survivors of both the American and German sides of the sinking of the Dorchester. Kurt Röser and Gerhard Buske, who had been part of the crew of the German U-boat that had torpedoed the Dorchester met with three Dorchester survivors, Ben Epstein, Walter Miller, and David Labadie, as well as Dick Swanson, who had been on board the Coast Guard Cutter Comanche, escorting the Dorchester's convoy.

On February 3, 2011, the Library of Congress Veterans History Project and the United States Navy Memorial co-hosted a special program at the memorial, in Washington, D.C.

The Jewish Chaplains Monument at Arlington National Cemetery's Chaplains' Hill was dedicated on October 24, 2011. The monument honors 14 Jewish chaplains who died during their military service. The monument is a granite upright with a bronze plaque, similar to the three other monuments at the site honoring Catholic, Protestant and World War I chaplains. Rabbi Goode's name is the first listed on the plaque. The Jewish Chaplains Monument was approved by the United States Congress in May 2011, and the monument itself, designed by Debora Jackson of Long Island, New York, was reviewed and approved by the U.S. Fine Arts Commission on June 16, 2011. The dedication ceremony was held in Arlington's Memorial Amphitheater. The ceremony was attended by Ernie Heaton, who survived the Dorchester sinking, and Richard Swanson who was on the Coast Guard rescue team.

=== U.S. postage stamp ===
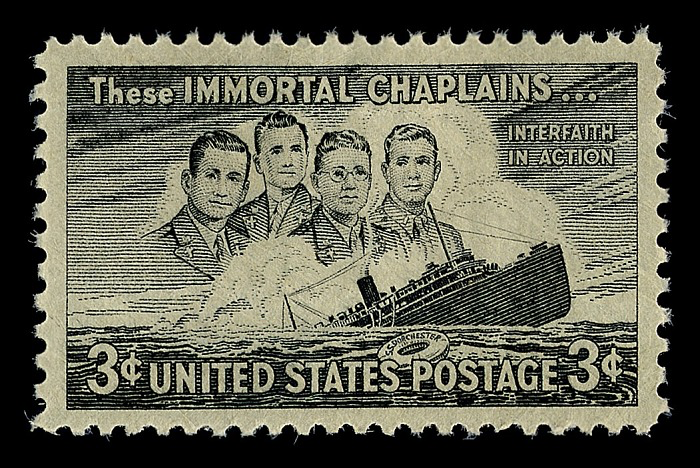
Four Chaplains stamp, 1948

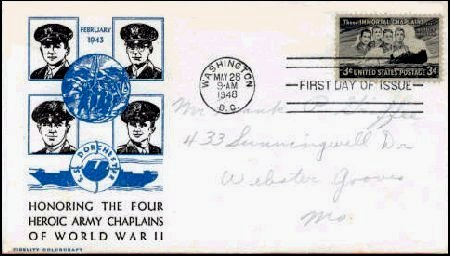
Four Chaplains Stamp on official first day cover, 1948

The chaplains were honored with a commemorative stamp that was issued in 1948, and was designed by Louis Schwimmer, the head of the Art Department of the New York branch of the U.S. Post Office Department (now called the USPS). This stamp is highly unusual, because until 2011, U.S. stamps were not normally issued in honor of someone other than a president of the United States until at least ten years after his or her death.

The stamp went through three revisions before the final design was chosen. None of the names of the chaplains were included on the stamp, nor were their faiths (although the faiths had been listed on one of the earlier designs): instead, the words on the stamp were "These Immortal Chaplains ... Interfaith in Action". Another phrase included in an earlier design that was not part of the final stamp was "died to save men of all faiths". By the omission of their names, the stamp commemorated the event, rather than the individuals per se, thus obfuscating the ten-year rule in the same way as did later stamps honoring Neil Armstrong in 1969 and Buzz Aldrin in 1994.

=== Chapel of Four Chaplains ===
The Chapel of the Four Chaplains was dedicated on February 3, 1951, by President Harry S. Truman to honor these chaplains of different faiths in the basement of Grace Baptist Church of Philadelphia. In his dedication speech, the President said, "This interfaith shrine ... will stand through long generations to teach Americans that as men can die heroically as brothers so should they live together in mutual faith and goodwill."

The chapel dedication included a reminder that the interfaith team represented by the Four Chaplains was unusual. Although the chapel was dedicated as an all-faiths chapel, no Catholic priest took part in the dedication ceremony, because, as Msgr. Thomas McCarthy of the National Catholic Welfare Conference explained to Time magazine, "canon law forbids joint worship."

In addition to supporting work that exemplifies the idea of "Interfaith in Action", recalling the story of the Four Chaplains, the chapel presents awards to individuals whose work reflects interfaith goals. 1984 was the first time that the award went to a military chaplain team composed of a rabbi, priest, and minister, recalling in a special way the four chaplains themselves, when the Rabbi Louis Parris Hall of Heroes Gold Medallion was presented to Rabbi Arnold Resnicoff; Catholic priest Fr. George Pucciarelli; and Protestant minister Danny Wheeler—the three chaplains present at the scene of the 1983 Beirut barracks bombing. The story of these three United States Navy chaplains was itself memorialized in a speech by President Ronald Reagan, on April 12, 1984.

In 1972, Grace Baptist Church moved to Blue Bell and sold the building to Temple University two years later. Temple University eventually decided to renovate the building as the Temple Performing Arts Center. In February 2001, the Chapel of the Four Chaplains moved to the chapel at the Philadelphia Naval Shipyard.

=== Memorial foundations ===
- The Four Chaplains Memorial Foundation, the only national 501(c)(3) charity related to the Four Chaplains' legacy, is housed at the former U.S. Naval Chapel located at the former South Philadelphia Navy Yard. Its official mission statement is "to further the cause of 'unity without uniformity' by encouraging goodwill and cooperation among all people. The organization achieves its mission by advocating for and honoring people whose deeds symbolize the legacy of the Four Chaplains aboard the U.S.A.T. Dorchester in 1943." In addition to its other goals and objectives, it supports memorial services that honor the memory of the chaplains and tell their story by publishing Guidelines for Four Chaplains Interfaith Memorial Services. Additionally, it sponsors an Emergency Chaplains Corps to provide support for first responders in disaster situations, and scholarship competitions for graduating high school seniors, focusing on the values of "inclusion, cooperation, and unity" exemplified by the Four Chaplains story. The competitions include a National Art Scholarship contest, a National Essay Scholarship contest, and a National Project Lifesaver Scholarship contest.
- The Four Chaplains Memorial of York County, Pennsylvania, was incorporated in 2018 after more than 25 years of annual remembrances of the Four Chaplains. The York County group came together due to the connection the community had with Rabbi Goode who served a congregation in York prior to his service on the Dorchester. The group holds an annual breakfast event that honors the Four Chaplains, presents legion of honor awards to deserving community members and raises scholarship funds for students from the Goode Middle School in York.
- The Immortal Chaplains Foundation was incorporated in October 1997 as a Minnesota non-profit corporation. The original concept for the foundation was from David Fox, nephew of Chaplain George Fox, and Rosalie Goode Fried, the daughter of Chaplain Alexander Goode. The organization's goal is "to honor individuals, both past and present, whose lives exemplify the compassion of the four 'Immortal Chaplains' and who have risked all to protect others of different faith or ethnicity." The group presents an annual Prize for Humanity, "to broaden national and international awareness of the legacy of the four 'Immortal Chaplains,'" "to inspire youth to the values of the four 'Immortal Chaplains,'" and "to find new partners and ways to tell this story and preserve the legacy". At the 1999 award ceremony, held in Minnesota, South African Bishop Desmond Tutu helped present Prizes for Humanity that included posthumous awards for Amy Biehl, an American Stanford University student and Fulbright scholar who was stabbed to death in South Africa while working to establish a legal education center; and Charles W. David, an African-American Coast Guardsman on board the Coast Guard Cutter Comanche, who rescued many of the Dorchester survivors, later dying from pneumonia as a result of his efforts. The establishment of the Immortal Chaplains Foundation included some controversy, when the Chapel of Four Chaplains sued Fox to prevent him and his new group from using the phrase "The Four Chaplains" or the image of them that appeared on the U.S. postage stamp.

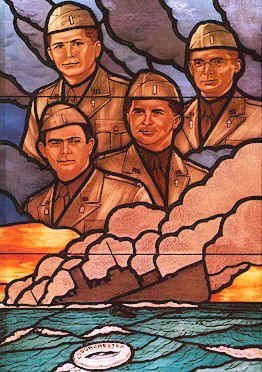
Four Chaplains stained glass window, U.S. Pentagon

=== Chapels and sanctuaries ===
- Immortal Chaplains Memorial Sanctuary – On the Queen Mary in Long Beach, California, and operated by the Immortal Chaplains Foundation. The foundation was founded by the chaplains' families and survivors of the Dorchester tragedy, including three survivors of U-boat 223, which sank the Dorchester on February 3, 1943. The Queen Mary transported these men to the US as POWs one year after the sinking of the Dorchester.
- The chapel at the Pittsburgh International Airport was dedicated to the Four Chaplains in 1994.
- Joint Base Lewis-McChord, Washington, Four Chaplains' Memorial Chapel & Family Life Center.
- Chapel at Camp Tuckahoe, Boy Scouts of America, in York County, Pennsylvania, dedicated in memory of Chaplain Goode.
- Camp Humphreys, South Korea, Four Chaplains Memorial Chapel is part of the expansion of the Camp Humphreys Army Base, and is scheduled to open in either 2018 or 2019.

=== Stained glass windows ===
- United States Pentagon, "A" Ring
- Fort Jackson, South Carolina, U.S. Army Chaplain Museum
- Fort Bliss, Texas, in the U.S. Army Sergeant Majors Academy Four Chaplains Classroom
- Fort Snelling, Minnesota, Chapel of Immortal Chaplains
- National Cathedral, Washington, D.C, War Memorial Chapel, Sacrifice for Freedom window
- Post Chapel at West Point
- Memorial Chapel, United States Army War College, Carlisle Barracks, Pennsylvania
- Basilica of the National Shrine of Mary, Queen of the Universe, Orlando, Florida, North American Saints Window
- Plymouth Congregational Church, Minneapolis, Minnesota
- Maxwell Air Force Base, Alabama, Grace Chapel
- Chaplains Window, Saint James the Greater Roman Catholic Church, Charles Town, West Virginia
- Cathedral of the Air, Lakehurst, New Jersey

=== Sculptures and plaques ===
- Brotherhood Memorial, Cleveland Cultural Gardens, Rockefeller Park, Cleveland, Ohio. Installed in 1953. Large granite pillar upon which there is a bronze plaque of the Four Chaplains standing in the prow of a large boat with an angelic figure behind and above them. Text memorializes, by name, each chaplain and finishes with "the unity of this nation founded upon the truth of human brotherhood".
- Four Chaplains Memorial, resembling a flying white bird, by Italian-American sculptor Costantino Nivola. Former water sculpture located at the entrance to National Memorial Park, in Falls Church, VA, near Washington, D.C.
- Memorial at Arborcrest Cemetery, created by sculptor Carlton W. Angell, dedicated to the Four Chaplains in Ann Arbor, Michigan in 1954.
- Memorial plaque at Belmont Park Racecourse in Elmont, New York. It is located behind the clubhouse section of the grandstand. It is bolted onto a rock on the walkway leading to the racing secretary's office.
- Memorial plaque in Harvard University's Memorial Church
- Memorial plaque in the main lobby (second floor) of the Kings County Courthouse, at 360 Adams Street, Brooklyn, New York.
- Memorial, public park, Dorchester, Wisconsin.
- Memorial plaque ("The Four Chaplains Marker"), Kingwood Memorial Park, Ohio.
- St. Paul's Episcopal Church, Hebron, Maryland: memorials set up both inside and outside of the church.

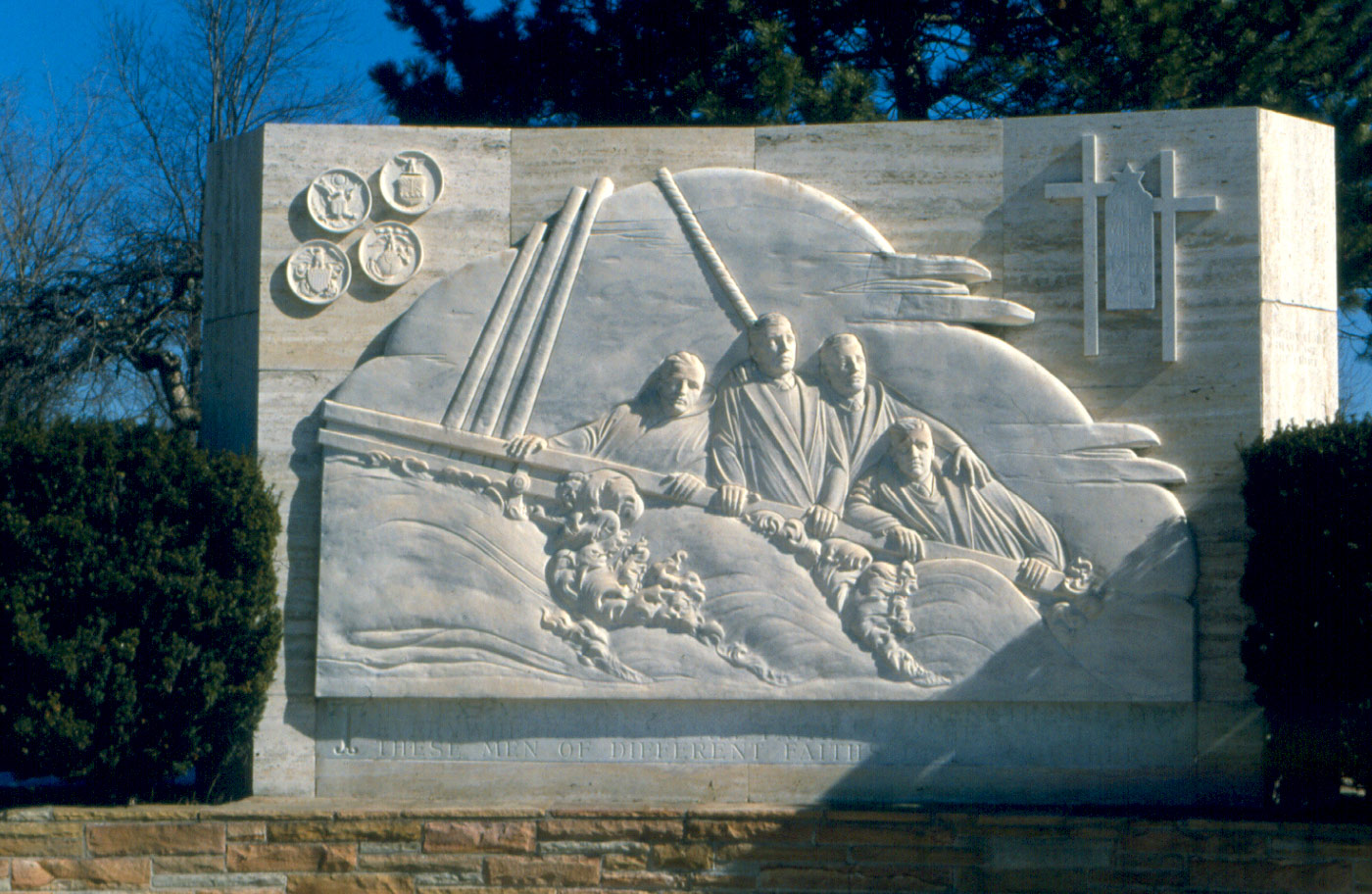
Memorial, Ann Arbor, Michigan

- Plaque, Rhode Island State House, commemorating the Four Chaplains and a Rhode Island native, Walter McHugh, a Coast Guard member who also lost his life on the Dorchester.
- Four Chaplains Memorial, Ft. Wadsworth, Staten Island, New York.
- Four Chaplains Monument, Bottineau, North Dakota.
- Memorial, Huntington Park, Newport News, Virginia.
- Memorial plaque, Mayor Andy Parise Park, Cedarhurst, New York
- Memorial sculpture, Washington Park Cemetery, Indiana.
- Wax display at the National Historical Wax Museum (open from 1958 to 1982, now closed) in Washington, D.C.
- Memorial outside American Legion Post 61, Sterling St., Watertown, NY.
- Four Chaplains Monument, Timothy Frost United Methodist Church, Thetford Center, Vermont. From 1936 to 1938, Rev. George Lansing Fox served as the pastor of this church and the church in Union Village Vermont.
- Four Chaplains Memorial, outside St. Stephen's Church, Kearny, NJ. St. Stephen's was Father Washington's last assignment before he joined the Army. On the 70th Anniversary of the sinking of the Dorchester, this statue was dedicated. The front shows the four men, arms locked, praying on the stern of the Dorchester, and the back is an angel, carrying four lifejackets for the men.
- Memorial at Olathe Veterans Memorial Park, in Olathe, Kansas.
- Plaque, elevator lobby second floor, Raymond G Murphy VA Medical Center, Albuquerque, NM
- Plaque dedicated to the Four Immortal Chaplains, at the entrance to the Albany, New York War Memorial.
- Memorial plaque in Riverside Park opposite the entrance to Riverside Church, New York, New York.
- A bas-relief tribute to the Four Chaplains located at the pedestal base of the Guglielmo Marconi statue, located in Church Square Park in Hoboken, NJ.

=== Miscellaneous remembrances ===
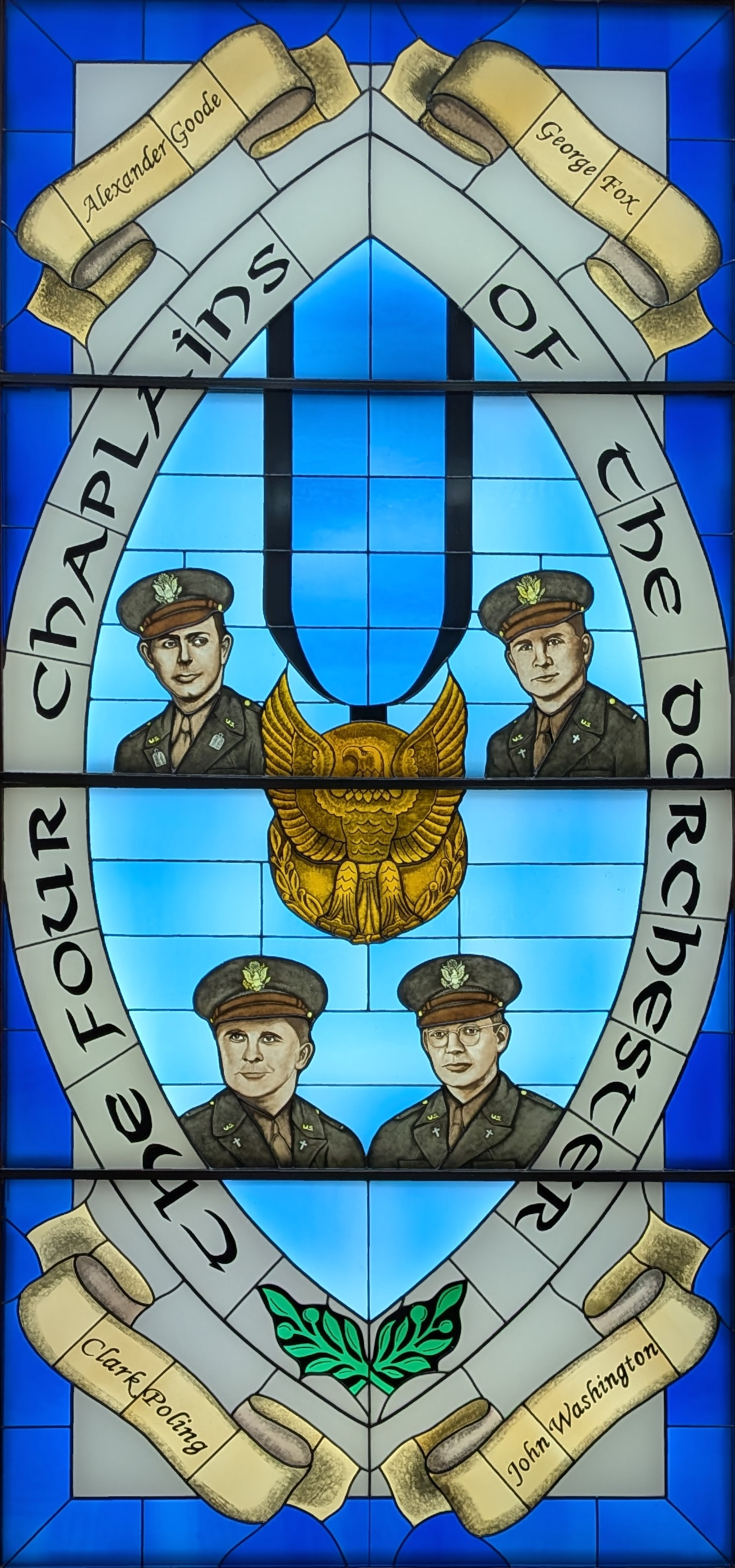
Stained Glass at the U.S. Army Institute for Religious Leadership

- The Four Chaplains Memorial Viaduct, carrying Ohio State Route 172 over the Tuscarawas River in Massillon, Ohio, was built in 1949 and refurbished in 1993. It is part of the old Lincoln Highway. A memorial plaque can be found on the eastern end.
- "Field of the Four Chaplains" at Fort Benning, Georgia (now renamed Fort Moore).
- The 23rd Degree of the Ancient Accepted Scottish Rite of Freemasonry (Northern Jurisdiction) is based on the Four Chaplains incident, teaching "that faith in God will find expression in love for our fellow man, even to the ultimate personal sacrifice".
- Alexander D. Goode Elementary School in York, Pennsylvania. Students honor the Four Chaplains annually.
- Four Chaplains Memorial Swimming Pool, Veterans Hospital, Bronx, New York.
- Knights of Columbus Council #13901, located at Fort Leonard Wood is known as the "Four Chaplains Council".

== See also ==
- Chaplain Corps (United States Army)
- Cecil Pugh – a South African chaplain in the Royal Air Force who gave his life in similar circumstances in 1941
- Musicians of the Titanic – lost at sea as RMS Titanic sank in 1912
- Tim Vakoc (1960–2009) – US Army chaplain severely wounded in Iraq in 2004
