= Grace Baptist Church of Philadelphia =

Church in Philadelphia

Coordinates: 40.147405°N 75.256937°W

Grace Baptist Church is a Baptist church in Blue Bell, Pennsylvania, United States. Under the leadership of Russell H. Conwell, the congregation became one of the largest in the country and was the parent of many other institutions, most notably Temple University and Temple Health. It is affiliated with the American Baptist Churches USA.

The church's former building is now the Temple Performing Arts Center, located on North Broad Street in Philadelphia.

== Growth under Russell Conwell ==
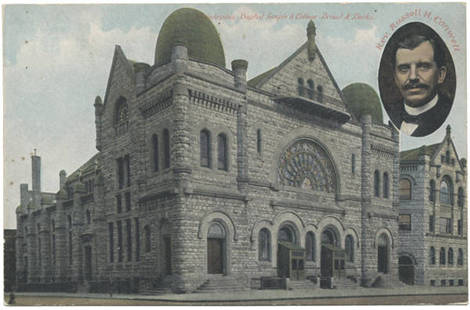
Postcard depicting the original Grace Baptist Church building and Russell Conwell

In 1882, Russell H. Conwell was appointed pastor of the church, whose building was still under construction. The congregation grew rapidly under Conwell's energetic and charismatic leadership, and a new building designed by Thomas Preston Lonsdale, the Baptist Temple, opened in 1891. With up to 15,000 worshippers every Sunday, it was both one of the first examples of an "institutional church" offering social and educational programming along with traditional services and a precursor of the 20th century mega-church.

== Homeless mission ==
In 1872, the tent church was moved to a neighboring lot, where it was used as a temporary homeless mission. Homeless wanderers were taken in, fed and given advice for a different and better life. From this work grew the Sunday Breakfast Association of Philadelphia which was formally founded in 1878.

== Temple University ==
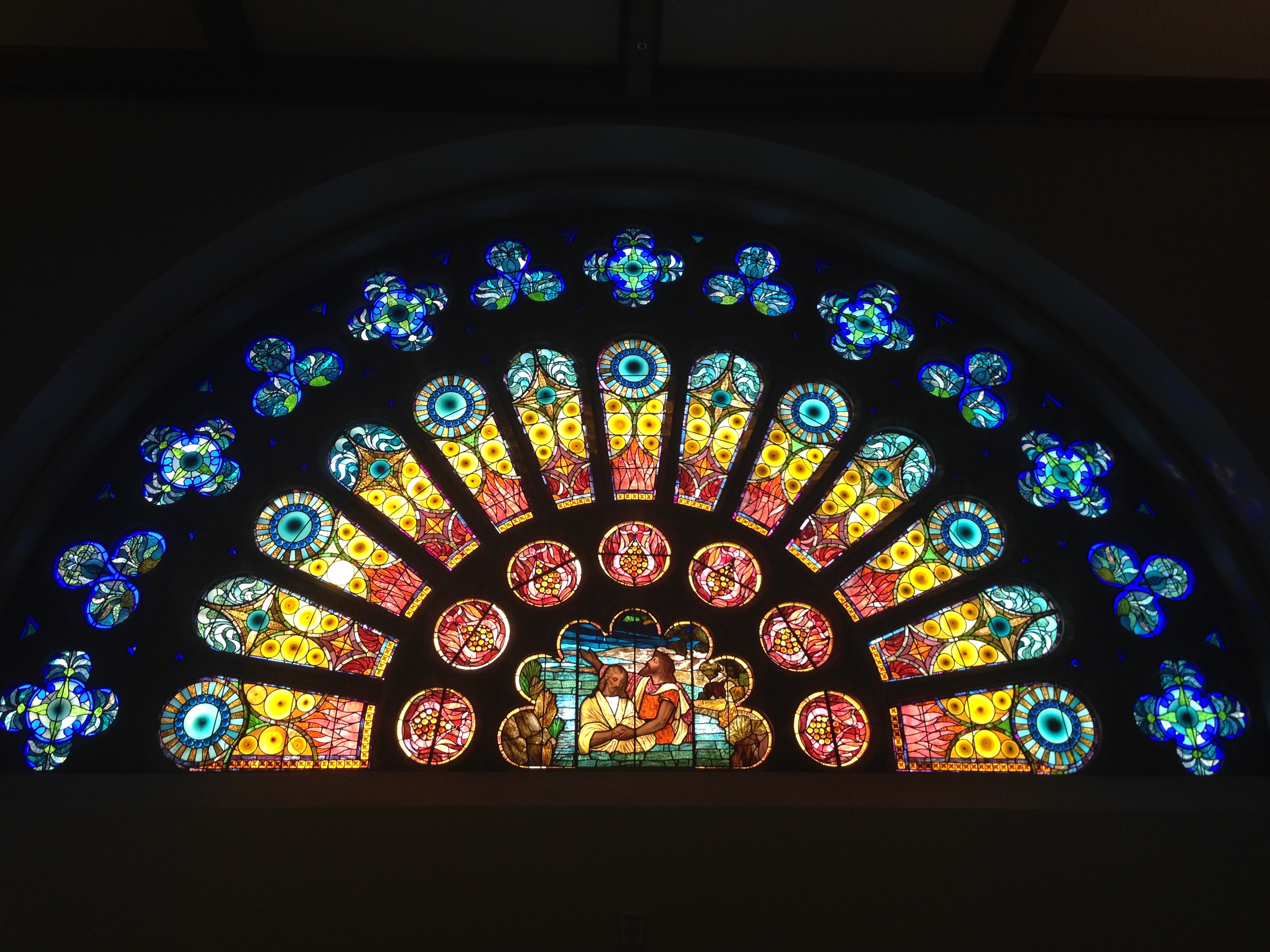
The stained glass window in the Temple Performing Arts Center, originally the Baptist Temple of the Grace Baptist Church of Philadelphia

Dr. Conwell started a program of evening classes at the church starting in 1884, which rapidly grew into Temple College. The church financed the college, filled many roles in the work of the college, and appointed the college's trustees until it received a university charter in 1907 and the new university's campus grew up around the church building.

== Temple Health ==
Grace Baptist members, under Conwell's leadership, were compelled to serve needs when they saw them. The church members founded Garretson Hospital, Samaritan Hospital and Greatheart, which became part of the Temple Health System.

== The Baptist Orphanage of Philadelphia ==
A firehouse called Conwell to officiate at a fireman’s funeral; he lost his life while firefighting. The man left three children with no one to care for them.

The same day, Conwell called on one of the church shut-ins who wanted to do something to help children in need. She was a gifted writer with considerable influence. She could write letters to encourage others to contribute to the support of an orphanage. The same day he met someone who sought a position in an orphanage, if possible. Around the same time, a doctor came to him and expressed her desire to use her skills differently, preferably to care for children in need.

He spoke to firefighters and police officers who all asked for an orphanage, primarily to support the children of their fallen comrades. Conwell met with church members and asked them to pray over the need.

Baptist Temple established The Baptist Orphanage of Philadelphia in 1879. It eventually became Baptist Services of Philadelphia and today exists as ChildPromise, offering residential and educational services to children and youth.

== Dr. Rev. Martin Luther King Jr. Speaks ==
On August 4, 1965, the Dr. Rev. Martin Luther King Jr. came to speak at Baptist Temple in the early part of the Civil Rights Movement. A great controversy was brewing in the city over Girard College's whites-only stipulation. In a steamy, no-airconditioned, packed auditorium of the church, King said: "So I believe in prayer, but I want you to understand tonight we aren’t going to solve the Civil Rights problem by prayer alone. God never intended for us to use prayer as a substitute for working intelligence."

== Chapel of the Four Chaplains ==
When Dr. Poling was pastor of the church, and plans were underway for a Conwell memorial, a great tragedy occurred. The SS Dorchester sank in the icy waters of the North Atlantic on February 3, 1943. Poling’s son, Reverend Clark Vandersall Poling, was one of those Four Chaplains who surrendered their life jackets to men who had none. Instead of the Conwell memorial, Dr. Poling championed building a monument to the Four Chaplains who went down with the ship. The interfaith memorial honored the four young clergymen of three faiths who lost their lives. The Chapel of the Four Chaplains, housed in the Lower Temple of Baptist Temple, featured a revolving altar of each religion. Today, the Chapel of the Four Chaplains resides at the Old Navy Yard.

== Decline and move to the suburbs ==
Attendance declined following Conwell's death in 1925, but the church remained a significant Philadelphia institution through the 1950s. Many prominent speakers appeared at the Baptist Temple, including Dwight D. Eisenhower, Franklin D. Roosevelt, Martin Luther King Jr., and Helen Keller. Visiting preachers included George A. Palmer, well-known to the Philadelphia radio audience from his Morning Cheer program.

By the late 1960s, however, its mostly white congregation had largely left the neighborhood and voted to move to the northern suburb of Blue Bell. The building was sold to Temple University in 1974 and after many years of disuse was renovated in 2010 as the Temple Performing Arts Center.

== Pastors ==
- L. B. Hartman, first pastor
- J. Green Miles, second pastor
- C. H. Kimball, third pastor
- Russell H. Conwell, writer, inspirational speaker, and first president of Temple University, fourth pastor
- Dr. Alonzo Ray Petty, fifth pastor
- Dr. Michael Joseph Twomey, sixth pastor
- Daniel A. Poling, newspaper editor, chaplain, author, clergyman, pastor of Marble Collegiate Church, President of World Christian Endeavor Union, seventh pastor
- Dr. Norman W. Paullin, eighth pastor
- Dr. Peter Vroom, ninth pastor
- Glenn C. Abbott, tenth pastor
- Eric Isaac Lewis, eleventh pastor
- Dr. Frederick O. Lewis, twelfth pastor
- Dr. George Hawthorne, thirteenth pastor
- David Braneky, fourteenth and current pastor
