= Lesser Feasts and Fasts =

Supplement to the liturgical calendar of the Episcopal Church

Information
- Author: Episcopal Church
- Language: English

Lesser Feasts and Fasts is a supplement to the liturgical calendar utilized by the Episcopal Church in the United States. It acts as a supplement to the liturgical calendar 1979 Book of Common Prayer by providing additional feasts and commemorations of saints and notable figures in Christian history, early Catholic church, and the Anglican Communion.

== Overview ==
Lesser Feasts and Fasts includes biographies, collects, and scriptural readings for each saint or notable figure recognized by the Episcopal Church. These commemorations are optional, allowing congregations to celebrate them at their discretion. The calendar aims to enrich the spiritual life of the church by providing examples of Christian faithfulness and devotion.

== History ==
The practice of commemorating saints and notable figures has ancient roots in Christianity. The Episcopal Church continues this tradition by including a diverse group of individuals in its calendar. The official list of saints is found in Lesser Feasts and Fasts. The 2024 edition is the most recent version, reflecting the church's recognition of both modern saints like Martin Luther King Jr. and ancient martyrs like Perpetua and her Companions.

== Structure ==
Each entry in Lesser Feasts and Fasts provides a biography, a collect (a short prayer), and suggested readings from the Bible. These elements can be used in personal prayer or in public worship services. The calendar is organized by date, with most saints commemorated on the anniversary of their death, symbolizing the beginning of their eternal life with God.

== Editions ==
Lesser Feasts and Fasts is periodically updated to include new commemorations and to reflect changes approved by the General Convention of the Episcopal Church.

=== 2024 Updates ===
In 2024, the General Convention of the Episcopal Church met in Louisville and approved updates to Lesser Feasts and Fasts. These updates included new commemorations and modifications to existing scripture readings.

=== Changes to Commemorations ===
Several new individuals were added to the calendar, expanding the range of recognized figures.

=== Revisions to Readings ===
Scripture readings for various feast days were adjusted to align with contemporary liturgical practices.

== Usage ==
The collects and readings from Lesser Feasts and Fasts are used in daily offices, Eucharistic services, and other liturgical settings.
