= SS Dorchester =

World War II troop ship

Coordinates: 59°22′N 48°42′W

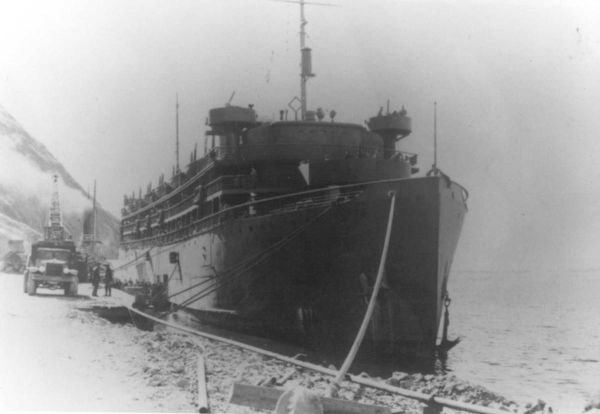
- SS Dorchester

History
- Name: Dorchester
- Namesake: Dorchester, Boston
- Operator: Merchants and Miners Transportation Company
- Route: Miami–Boston
- Builder: Newport News Shipbuilding and Dry Dock Company
- Yard number: 289
- Laid down: September 10, 1925
- Launched: March 20, 1926
- Acquired: Delivered July 17, 1926
- Name: SS Dorchester (troop transport)
- Owner: Control: War Shipping Administration
- Operator: Atlantic, Gulf & West Indies Steamship Lines (Agwilines)
- Acquired: January 24, 1942
- Fate: Torpedoed and sunk, February 3, 1943

General characteristics
- Type: Passenger ship / Troopship
- Tonnage: 5,649 GRT
- Length: 368 ft (112 m)
- Beam: 52 ft (16 m)
- Draft: 19 ft (5.8 m)
- Propulsion: Triple expansion engine
- Speed: 12 knots (22 km/h; 14 mph)
- Capacity: SS Dorchester : 314 passengers; as troop ship Dorchester : 751 troops
- Complement: SS Dorchester : 90; as troop ship Dorchester : 130 + 23 Navy Armed Guards
- Armament: as troop ship Dorchester : 1 × 3"/50 caliber gun; 1 × 4"/50 caliber gun; 4 × 20 mm guns

Dorchester was a coastal passenger steamship requisitioned and operated by the War Shipping Administration (WSA) in January 1942 for wartime use as a troop ship allocated to United States Army requirements. The ship was operated for WSA by its agent Atlantic, Gulf & West Indies Steamship Lines (Agwilines). The ship was in convoy SG 19 from New York to Greenland transiting the Labrador Sea when it was torpedoed by a German U-boat on February 3, 1943. The ship sank with loss of 674 of the 904 on board with one of the 230 survivors lost after rescue. The story of four Army chaplains, known as the "Four Chaplains" or the "Immortal Chaplains," who all gave away their life jackets to save others before they died, gained fame and led to many memorials.

== Commercial service ==
Dorchester, one of three identical ships, the first being Chatham (torpedoed and sunk August 27, 1942) and the last being Fairfax, was built for the Merchants and Miners Transportation Company by the Newport News Shipbuilding and Dry Dock Company. Keel laying was September 10, 1925 with launching on March 20, 1926, and delivery on July 17, 1926. The ship was designed for the coastwise trade with a capacity for 302 first class and 12 steerage passengers for a total of 314 with a crew of 90 along the East coast between Miami and Boston. Propulsion was by a 3,000 horsepower, triple expansion steam engine supplied by four oil fired Scotch boilers with steam at 220 pounds pressure driving a single propeller for a speed of 13.5 knots (15.5 mph; 25.0 km/h).

Passengers were provided three decks, two promenade decks and the boat deck, with four suites having private baths and thirty rooms with beds, ninety-eight with double berths and eight with single berths with most opening onto both the corridor and deck and all had "European style" telephones with receiver and transmitter in one handset. Public spaces included a dance pavilion and sun parlor in addition to the typical lounge and smoking rooms. Cargo of about 3,300 tons was all handled through side ports rather than deck hatches. Refrigerated spaces of 1,873 cubic feet (53.0 m^{3}) for provisions, including ice cream storage, was provided to six compartments cooled by a 4-ton Brunswick compressor. A separate chilled pantry had 210 cubic feet (5.9 m^{3}) of storage.

== World War II ==
The ship was delivered by Merchants and Miners Transportation Company to the War Shipping Administration (WSA) at Baltimore on January 24, 1942, for operation by Atlantic, Gulf & West Indies Steamship Lines (Agwilines) as agent for WSA and allocated to United States Army requirements. Dorchester was converted to a troopship by Agwilines in New York, and fitted with additional lifeboats and life rafts, as well as four 20 mm guns, a 3"/50 caliber gun fore, and a 4"/50 caliber gun aft.

Dorchester entered service in February 1942, crewed by many of her former officers, including her master initially, and a contingent of Navy Armed Guards to man the guns and to handle communications. The ship was neither owned nor bareboat chartered by the Army and thus not officially designated a United States Army Transport (USAT). The allocation to Army requirements, transport of Army personnel and presence of the Army administrative staff under the Transport Commander in command of embarked troops, led some to assume the ship was an Army transport.

=== Loss ===
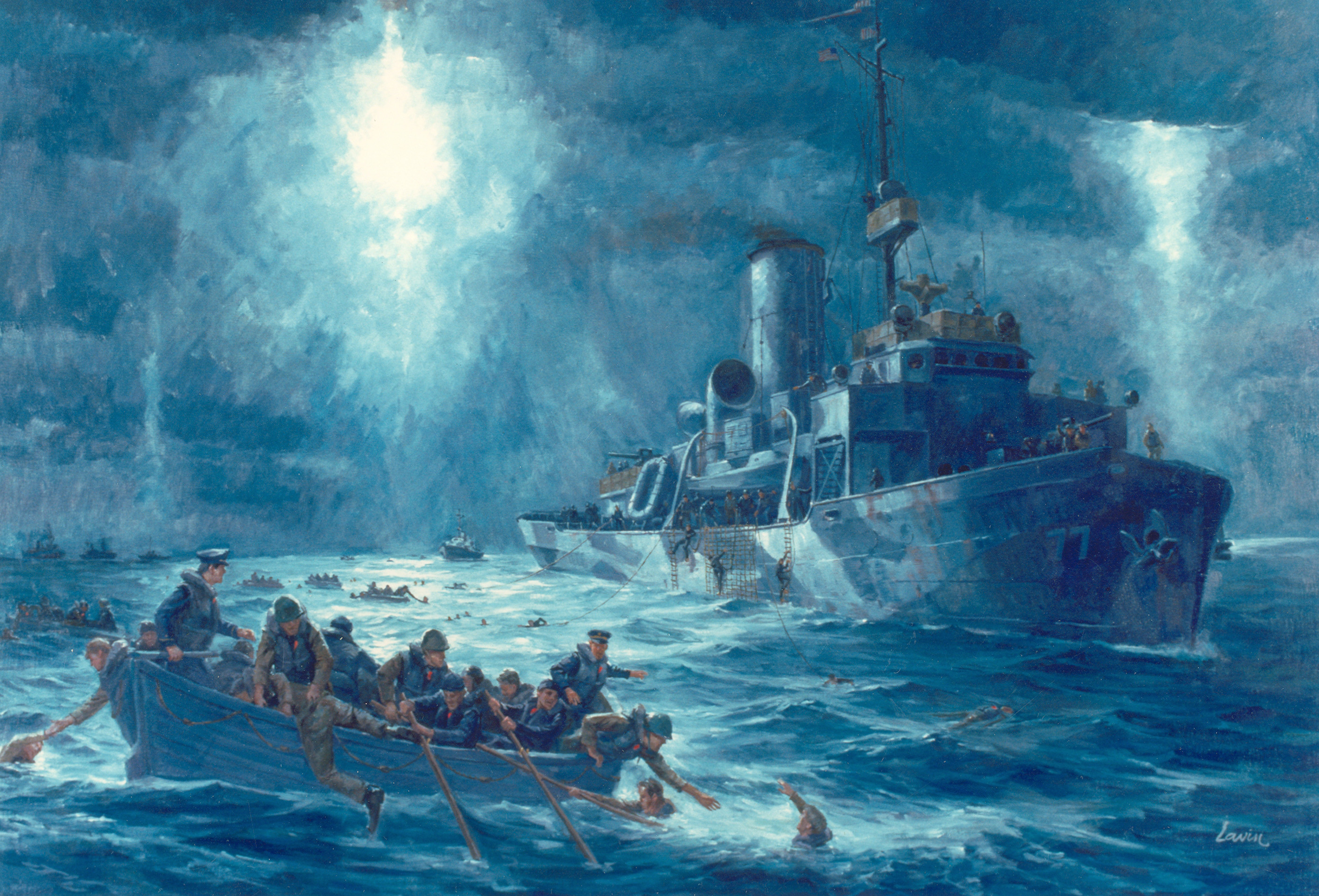
Coast Guard cutter Escanaba rescues Dorchester survivors, February 3, 1943.

On January 23, 1943, Dorchester left New York harbor, bound for the Army Command Base at Narsarsuaq in southern Greenland. SG-19 consisted of six ships: SS Dorchester, two merchant ships (SS Lutz and SS Biscaya) that were leased by the United States from the Norwegian government-in-exile, and their escorts, the small United States Coast Guard cutters Comanche, Escanaba (both 165 feet), and Tampa (240 feet).

During the early morning hours of February 3, 1943, at 12:55, Dorchester was torpedoed by German submarine U-223. The damage was severe, boiler power was lost, and there was inadequate steam to sound the full 6-whistle signal to abandon ship, and Dorchester sank by the bow in about 20 minutes. Loss of power prevented the crew from sending a radio distress signal, and no rockets or flares were launched to alert the escorts. A severe list prevented launch of some port side lifeboats, and some lifeboats capsized through overcrowding. Survivors in the water were so stiff from cold they could not even grasp the cargo nets on rescue vessels. The crew of Escanaba employed a new "retriever" rescue technique whereby swimmers clad in wet suits swam to victims in the water and secured a line to them so they could be hauled onto the ship. By this method, Escanaba saved 133 men (one died later) and Comanche saved 97 men of the 904 aboard Dorchester. The sinking of Dorchester was the worst single loss of American personnel of any American convoy during World War II.

Life jackets offered little protection from hypothermia, which killed most men in the water. Water temperature was 34 °F (1 °C) and air temperature was 36 °F (2 °C). When additional rescue ships arrived on February 4 "hundreds of dead bodies were seen floating on the water, kept up by their life jackets."

=== The Four Chaplains ===
The Four Chaplains were four of the Army officers among the military personnel being transported overseas for duty: they died because they gave up their life jackets to save others. These chaplains included Methodist minister George L. Fox, Reformed Church in America minister Clark V. Poling, Catholic Church priest John P. Washington and Rabbi Alexander B. Goode. Congress established February 3 as "Four Chaplains Day" to commemorate this act of heroism, and on July 14, 1960, created the Chaplain's Medal for Heroism, presented posthumously to the next of kin of each of the chaplains by Secretary of the Army Wilber M. Brucker at Fort Myer, Virginia on January 18, 1961.

==== Commemoration on US postage ====
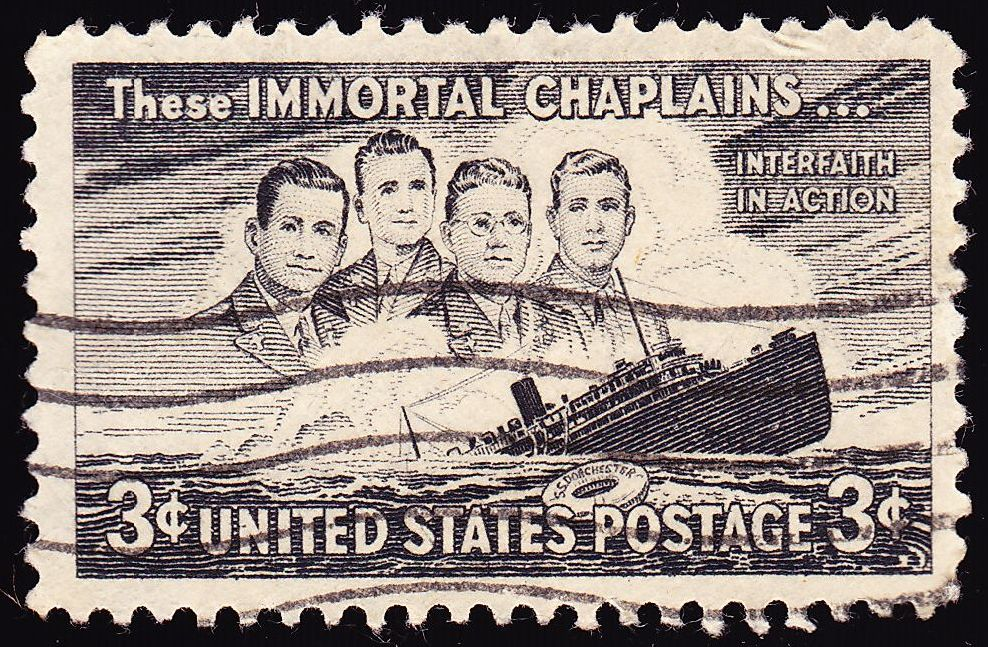
The Immortal Chaplains Issue of 1948

In 1948 the U.S. Post Office issued a commemorative stamp in honor of the heroism and sacrifice of the chaplains. It was designed by Louis Schwimmer, the head of the Art Department of the New York branch of the Post Office. This stamp was highly unusual, because until 2011, U.S. stamps were not normally issued in honor of someone other than a President of the United States until at least ten years after their death.

The stamp went through three revisions before the final design was chosen. None of the names of the chaplains were included on the stamp, nor were their faiths (although the faiths had been listed on one of the earlier designs): instead, the words on the stamp were "These Immortal Chaplains...Interfaith in Action." Another phrase included in an earlier design that was not part of the final stamp was "died to save men of all faiths." By the omission of their names, the stamp commemorated the event, rather than the individuals per se, thus obfuscating the ten-year rule in the same way as later did stamps honoring Neil Armstrong in 1969 and Buzz Aldrin in 1994, both of whom were still alive.

=== Notable passengers and crew ===
The American writer Jack Kerouac served on Dorchester, where he befriended an African-American cook named "Old Glory," who died when the ship sank after the torpedo attack. Kerouac would have also been on the ship during the attack, but for a telegram he received from coach Lou Little, asking him to return to Columbia University to play football.

== See also ==
- List by death toll of ships sunk by submarines
