= German submarine U-223 =

German World War II submarine

Coordinates: 38°48′N 14°10′E

History

Nazi Germany
- Name: U-223
- Ordered: 15 August 1940
- Builder: Germaniawerft, Kiel
- Yard number: 653
- Laid down: 15 July 1941
- Launched: 16 April 1942
- Commissioned: 6 June 1942
- Fate: Sunk, 30 March 1944

General characteristics
- Class & type: Type VIIC submarine
- Displacement: 769 tonnes (757 long tons) surfaced; 871 t (857 long tons) submerged
- Length: 67.10 m (220 ft 2 in) o/a; 50.50 m (165 ft 8 in) pressure hull
- Beam: 6.20 m (20 ft 4 in) o/a; 4.70 m (15 ft 5 in) pressure hull
- Height: 9.60 m (31 ft 6 in)
- Draught: 4.74 m (15 ft 7 in)
- Installed power: 2,800–3,200 PS (2,100–2,400 kW; 2,800–3,200 bhp) (diesels); 750 PS (550 kW; 740 shp) (electric)
- Propulsion: 2 shafts; 2 × diesel engines; 2 × electric motors
- Speed: 17.7 knots (32.8 km/h; 20.4 mph) surfaced; 7.6 knots (14.1 km/h; 8.7 mph) submerged
- Range: 8,500 nmi (15,700 km; 9,800 mi) at 10 knots (19 km/h; 12 mph) surfaced; 80 nmi (150 km; 92 mi) at 4 knots (7.4 km/h; 4.6 mph) submerged
- Test depth: 230 m (750 ft); Crush depth: 250–295 m (820–968 ft)
- Complement: 4 officers, 40–56 enlisted
- Armament: 5 × 53.3 cm (21 in) torpedo tubes (four bow, one stern); 14 × torpedoes or 26 TMA mines; 1 × 8.8 cm (3.46 in) deck gun (220 rounds); 1 x 2 cm (0.79 in) C/30 AA gun

Service record
- Part of: 8th U-boat Flotilla; 6 June 1942 – 31 January 1943; 6th U-boat Flotilla; 1 February 1943 – 31 October 1943; 29th U-boat Flotilla; 1 November 1943 – 30 March 1944
- Identification codes: M 01 671
- Commanders: Oblt.z.S. / Kptlt. Karl-Jürg Wächter; 6 June 1942 – 12 January 1944; Oblt.z.S. Peter Gerlach; 12 January – 30 March 1944
- Operations: 6 patrols: 1st patrol: 12 January – 6 March 1943; 2nd patrol: 15 April – 24 May 1943; 3rd patrol: 14 September – 16 October 1943; 4th patrol: 20 November – 17 December 1943; 5th patrol: 19 January – 12 February 1944; 6th patrol: 16 – 30 March 1944
- Victories: 2 merchant ships sunk (12,556 GRT); 1 warship sunk (1,935 tons); 1 merchant ship total loss (4,970 GRT); 1 warship total loss (1,300 tons)

German submarine U-223 was a Type VIIC U-boat of Nazi Germany's Kriegsmarine during World War II.

Ordered on 15 August 1940 from the Germaniawerft shipyard in Kiel, she was laid down on 15 July 1941 as yard number 653, launched on 16 April 1942 and commissioned on 6 June under the command of Kapitänleutnant Karl-Jürg Wächter.

A member of eight wolfpacks, she sank two ships totalling 12,556 gross register tons (GRT) in six patrols. She also sank one warship of 1,935 tons and caused one ship of 4,970 GRT and one warship of 1,300 tons to be declared total losses. Notable among the ships sunk was SS Dorchester, which carried the Four Chaplains, remembered for giving up their lifebelts to soldiers during the sinking on 3 February 1943.

U-223 was sunk on 30 March 1944 by British warships in the Mediterranean Sea. 23 men died; there were 27 survivors.

== Design ==
German Type VIIC submarines were preceded by the shorter Type VIIB submarines. U-223 had a displacement of 769 tonnes (757 long tons) when at the surface and 871 tonnes (857 long tons) while submerged. She had a total length of 67.10 m (220 ft 2 in), a pressure hull length of 50.50 m (165 ft 8 in), a beam of 6.20 m (20 ft 4 in), a height of 9.60 m (31 ft 6 in), and a draught of 4.74 m (15 ft 7 in). The submarine was powered by two Germaniawerft F46 four-stroke, six-cylinder supercharged diesel engines producing a total of 2,800 to 3,200 metric horsepower (2,060 to 2,350 kW; 2,760 to 3,160 shp) for use while surfaced, two AEG GU 460/8–27 double-acting electric motors producing a total of 750 metric horsepower (550 kW; 740 shp) for use while submerged. She had two shafts and two 1.23 m (4 ft) propellers. The boat was capable of operating at depths of up to 230 metres (750 ft).

The submarine had a maximum surface speed of 17.7 knots (32.8 km/h; 20.4 mph) and a maximum submerged speed of 7.6 knots (14.1 km/h; 8.7 mph). When submerged, the boat could operate for 80 nautical miles (150 km; 92 mi) at 4 knots (7.4 km/h; 4.6 mph); when surfaced, she could travel 8,500 nautical miles (15,700 km; 9,800 mi) at 10 knots (19 km/h; 12 mph). U-223 was fitted with five 53.3 cm (21 in) torpedo tubes (four fitted at the bow and one at the stern), fourteen torpedoes, one 8.8 cm (3.46 in) SK C/35 naval gun, 220 rounds, and a 2 cm (0.79 in) C/30 anti-aircraft gun. The boat had a complement of between forty-four and sixty.

== Service history ==
=== First patrol ===
For her first patrol, U-223 departed Kiel on 12 January 1943. Keeping to the Norwegian side of the North Sea, she entered the Atlantic Ocean having negotiated the gap between Iceland and the Faroe Islands. She moved to the south of Greenland. There, she sank the troop transport SS Dorchester west of Cape Farewell on 3 February. The troop ship was underway with a total of 904 people on board; 675 of them died in the sinking. Among the dead were the "Four Chaplains" who had given up their lifebelts to soldiers as the ship sank. The clergymen were posthumously awarded the Distinguished Service Cross and the Purple Heart; the US Congress declared 3 February "Chaplains Observance Day" in 1961.

She also sank Winkler on 23 February; the ship went down in 45 seconds. The U-boat then prevented any retaliation from the convoy escort ships by diving underneath survivors in the water.

U-223 was attacked by a British Flying Fortress of No. 59 Squadron RAF on 1 March. The aircraft dropped seven depth charges which overshot. Damage to the U-boat was slight, but the Fortress was hit and only just managed to return to its base.

The submarine docked at St. Nazaire in occupied France on 6 March.

=== Second patrol ===
U-223 was depth charged to the surface and shelled by the destroyer HMS Hesperus in mid-Atlantic on 11 May 1943. Two men were lost overboard; one of them was rescued by U-359. Meanwhile, U-223 had escaped the wrath of the British ship and returned to St. Nazaire. Due to the repairs needed, she did not put to sea again until September.

=== Third patrol ===
Having left St. Nazaire on 14 September, the boat had passed the heavily fortified British base at Gibraltar by the 26th. Before docking at Toulon on 16 October, she attacked Stanmore on the second near Cape Ivi, Algeria. The badly damaged ship was taken under tow by two tugs. She was beached at Cape Tenes where she broke in two and was declared a total loss.

=== Fourth and fifth patrols ===
Also a total loss was the British frigate HMS Cuckmere (K299). She had been escorting a convoy off Bougie when she was hit. She was towed to Algiers and returned to the US Navy in 1946.

U-223's fifth sortie was relatively uneventful, passing south of Sardinia and headed for the Italian mainland.

=== Sixth patrol and loss ===
The U-boat had left Toulon on 16 March 1944. She was detected by the ASDIC (sonar) of HMS Ulster on the 29th north of Palermo. Ulster was not alone; she was accompanied by two other destroyers - HMS Laforey and HMS Tumult. By early morning of the 30th, the U-boat, after heavy depth charging, was forced to the surface, where she was engaged by gunfire. Ulster had been replaced by two escort destroyers, HMS Hambledon and HMS Blencathra. Before being sunk, U-223 managed to fire three torpedoes, one of which sank HMS Laforey with heavy losses.

23 men from the U-boat died; there were 27 survivors.

=== Wolfpacks ===
U-223 took part in eight wolfpacks, namely:

- Haudegen (26 January – 2 February 1943)
- Nordsturm (2 – 9 February 1943)
- Haudegen (9 – 15 February 1943)
- Taifun (15 – 20 February 1943)
- Amsel (22 April – 3 May 1943)
- Amsel 2 (3 – 6 May 1943)
- Elbe (7 – 10 May 1943)
- Elbe 2 (10 – 12 May 1943)

== Summary of raiding history ==
Date	Ship Name	Nationality	Tonnage (Note: Merchant ship tonnages are in gross register tons. Military vessels are listed by tons displacement.)	Fate
3 February 1943	Dorchester	United States	5,649	Sunk
23 February 1943	Winkler	Panama	6,907	Sunk
2 October 1943	Stanmore	United Kingdom	4,970	Total loss
11 December 1943	HMS Cuckmere	Royal Navy	1,300	Total loss
30 March 1944	HMS Laforey	Royal Navy	1,935	Sunk

== Bibliography ==
- Busch, Rainer; Röll, Hans-Joachim (1999). German U-boat commanders of World War II : a biographical dictionary. Translated by Brooks, Geoffrey. London, Annapolis, Md: Greenhill Books, Naval Institute Press. ISBN 1-55750-186-6.
- Busch, Rainer; Röll, Hans-Joachim (1999). Deutsche U-Boot-Verluste von September 1939 bis Mai 1945 [German U-boat losses from September 1939 to May 1945]. Der U-Boot-Krieg (in German). Vol. IV. Hamburg, Berlin, Bonn: Mittler. ISBN 3-8132-0514-2.
- Edwards (1996). Dönitz and the Wolf Packs - The U-boats at War. Cassell Military Classics. pp. 160, 206, 211. ISBN 0-304-35203-9.
- Gröner, Erich; Jung, Dieter; Maass, Martin (1991). U-boats and Mine Warfare Vessels. German Warships 1815–1945. Vol. 2. Translated by Thomas, Keith; Magowan, Rachel. London: Conway Maritime Press. ISBN 0-85177-593-4.
