= List of people on the postage stamps of the United States =

This article lists people who have been featured on United States postage stamps, listed by their name, the year they were first featured on a stamp, and a short description of their notability. Since the United States Post Office (now United States Postal Service or USPS) issued its first stamp in 1847, over 4,000 stamps have been issued and over 800 people featured. People have been featured on multiple stamps in one issue, or over time, such as various Presidents of the United States. Through the years, a person has had to be deceased before their face appeared on a stamp, though the USPS will document that a stamp has commemorated people, living or deceased, without including their actual face on the stamp – such as the image of a yellow submarine from the 1969 eponymous album cover shown on the 1999 stamp commemorating four people (three then-still alive) who collectively formed The Beatles.

For the purpose of this list, "featured" may mean:

1. The likeness of a person,
2. The name of a person, or
3. People who have neither their likeness nor name on a stamp, but are documented by the United States Postal Service as being the subject of a stamp (see Reference).

== A ==
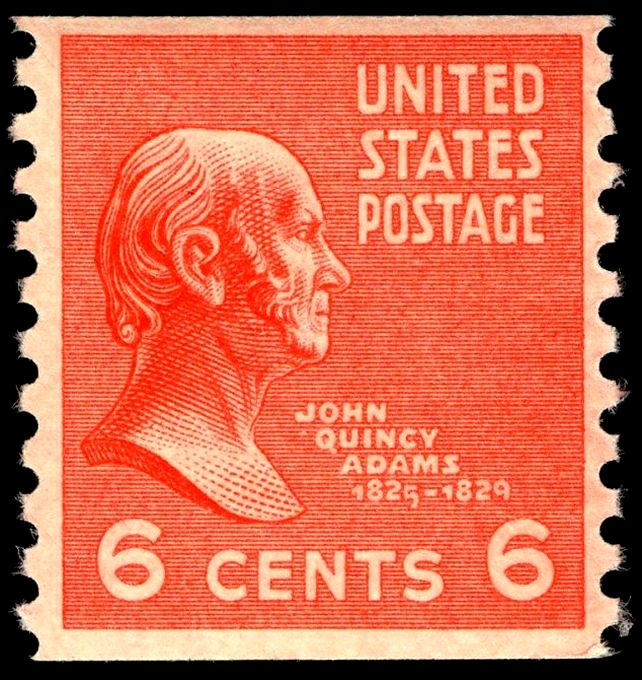
John Quincy Adams on a 1938 stamp

- Hank Aaron (2024) Black American baseball player
- Edwin Austin Abbey (2001) Illustrator
- Bud Abbott (1991) Comedian and actor
- Edward R. Abrams (2008) Film actor
- Dean Acheson (1993) 51st Secretary of State
- Roy Acuff (2003) Country singer, musician, and songwriter
- Abigail Adams (1985) First Lady
- Ansel Adams (2002) Photographer
- Jane Addams (1940) Social Worker
- John Adams (1938) 2nd president
- John Quincy Adams (1938, 1986) 6th president
- Samuel Adams (1976) Declaration of Independence signer
- Alvin Ailey (2004) Choreographer
- Louisa May Alcott (1940) Author

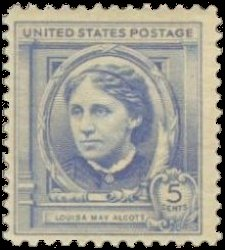
Louisa May Alcott on a 1940 stamp

- Buzz Aldrin (1994), (2019) Astronaut, engineer
- Horatio Alger Jr. (1982) Author
- Muhammad Ali (2026) American professional boxer and activist
- Dante Alighieri (1965) Poet
- Gracie Allen (2009) Comedian
- Richard Allen (2016) African-American bishop, founder of AME Church
- Steve Allen (2009) Comedian
- Fran Allison (2009) Actress
- C. Alfred "Chief" Anderson (2014) Aviator
- Marian Anderson (2005) Contralto
- Susan B. Anthony (1936) Suffragist, feminist, and abolitionist
- Virginia Apgar (1994) Inventor of the Agpar score
- Johnny Appleseed (1966) Conservationist
- Harold Arlen (1996) Composer

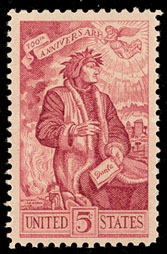
Dante Alighieri on a 1965 stamp

- Edwin Armstrong (1983) FM radio inventor
- Louis Armstrong (1995) Jazz singer, musician, and songwriter
- Neil Armstrong (1969), (2019) Astronaut, engineer
- Henry Harley "Hap" Arnold (1988) Air Force General
- Chester A. Arthur (1938) 21st President
- Ruth Asawa (2020) Sculptor, artist
- Arthur Ashe (2005) Tennis player
- John James Audubon (1940) Naturalist, painter
- Gene Autry (2010) Actor

== B ==
- Mildred Bailey (1994) Jazz singer
- Ella Baker (2009) Civil rights leader
- Josephine Baker (2008) Singer
- George Balanchine (2004) Choreographer
- Vasco Núñez de Balboa (1913) Explorer
- Abraham Baldwin (1985) Statesman
- James Baldwin (2004) Author
- Lucille Ball (2001) Actress
- Benjamin Banneker (1980) Surveyor, astronomer, mathematician and almanac author
- Theda Bara (1994) Actress
- Francis Barbé-Marbois (1953) Louisiana Purchase negotiator
- Samuel Barber (1997) Composer
- John Bardeen (2008) Physicist
- John Barry (1936) Naval officer

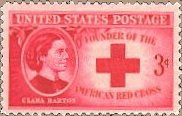
Clara Barton on a 1948 stamp

- Ethel Barrymore (1982) Actress
- John Barrymore (1982) Actor
- Lionel Barrymore (1982) Actor
- Frederic Bartholdi (1985) Sculptor and painter
- Clara Barton (1948) Nurse
- John Bartram (1999) Botanist
- William Bartram (1999) Botanist
- Count Basie (1996) Big band leader
- John Basilone (2005) Marine, Medal of Honor recipient
- Daisy Bates (2009) Civil rights leader
- James Beard (2014) Chef, TV personality, cookbook author
- Romare Bearden (2011) Artist
- The Beatles (1999) Rock music band
- Jim Beckwourth (1994) Explorer
- Norman Bel Geddes (2011) Industrial designer
- Alexander Graham Bell (1940) Inventor
- Saul Bellow (2024) Novelist
- Ruth Benedict (1995) Anthropologist
- Stephen Vincent Benét (1998) Author
- Jack Benny (1991) Comedian
- Edgar Bergen (1991) Ventriloquist
- Ingrid Bergman (2015) Actress
- Milton Berle (2009) Comedian
- Irving Berlin (2002) Composer

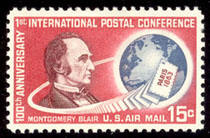
Montgomery Blair on a 1963 stamp

- Leonard Bernstein (2001) Conductor, composer
- Yogi Berra (2021) Baseball player
- Mary McLeod Bethune (1985) Educator and civil rights leader
- Albert Bierstadt (1998) Painter
- Hiram Bingham IV (2006) Diplomat
- George Caleb Bingham (1998) Painter

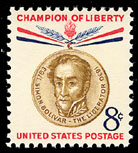
Simón Bolívar on a 1958 stamp

- Elizabeth Bishop (2012) Poet
- Emily Bissell (1980) Social worker, introduced Christmas Seals to U.S.
- Hugo Black (1986) Supreme Court justice
- Elizabeth Blackwell (1974) 1st U.S. female physician
- Montgomery Blair (1963) Maryland politician
- Eubie Blake (1995) Jazz pianist and composer

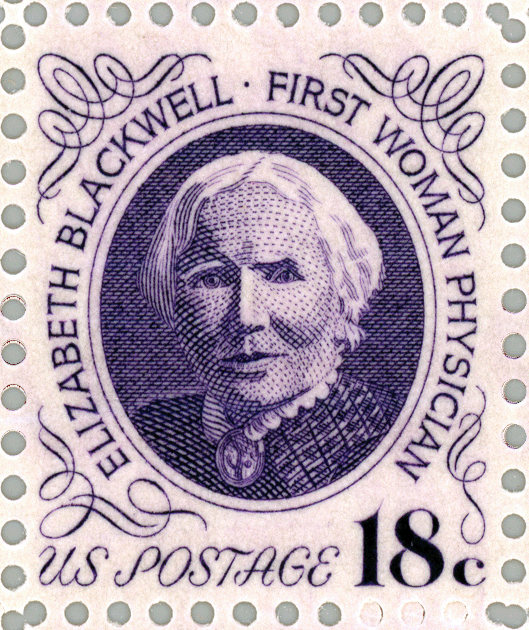
Elizabeth Blackwell on a 1974 stamp

- Nellie Bly (2002) Journalist
- Humphrey Bogart (1997) Actor
- Charles E. Bohlen (2006) Diplomat
- Simón Bolívar (1958) South American revolutionary
- Daniel Boone (1968) Pioneer and frontiersman
- Sandro Botticelli (1981) Painter
- Clara Bow (1994) Actress
- William Boyd (2009) Actor
- Elizabeth Boyer (2008) Actress
- Omar N. Bradley (2000) World War II Army General
- Louis Brandeis (2009) Supreme Court justice
- Mary Breckinridge (1998) Frontier Nursing Services founder
- William Brennan Jr. (2009) Supreme Court justice
- Fanny Brice (1991) Actress, singer and comedian
- Jim Bridger (1994) Explorer
- Joseph Brodsky (2012) Poet
- Gwendolyn Brooks (2012) Poet
- William Jennings Bryan (1986) 3-time presidential candidate
- Paul "Bear" Bryant (1997) Football coach
- James Buchanan (1938) 15th President
- Pearl S. Buck (1983) Author
- William Frank Buckley Jr. (2025) Political commentator and novelist
- Ralph Bunche (1982) Diplomat
- Luther Burbank (1940) Botanist
- Julia de Burgos (2010) Poet
- Arleigh Albert Burke (2010) Admiral
- George Burns (2009) Comedian
- Raymond Burr (2009) Actor
- Edgar Rice Burroughs (2012) Author
- Barbara Bush (2025) former First Lady
- George H. W. Bush (2019) 41st president
- Richard E. Byrd (1988) Antarctic explorer

== C ==
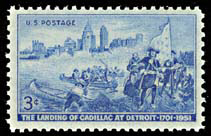
Antoine de la Mothe Cadillac on a 1951 stamp

- Juan Rodriguez Cabrillo (1992) Explorer
- Antoine de la Mothe Cadillac (1951) Explorer
- James Cagney (1999) Actor
- Alexander Calder (1998) Sculptor
- Melvin Calvin (2011) Chemist
- Walter Camp (2003) Football coach
- Roy Campanella (2006) Baseball player
- Frank Capra (2012) Motion picture director
- Hattie Caraway (2001) 1st female senator
- Chester Carlson (1988) Inventor
- Hoagy Carmichael (1996) Composer, singer and actor
- Andrew Carnegie (1960) Entrepreneur and philanthropist
- Art Carney (2009) Actor
- Charles Carroll of Carrollton (1976) Declaration of Independence signer

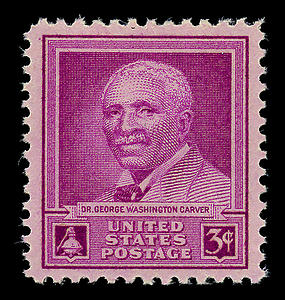
George Washington Carver on a 1948 stamp

- Kit Carson (1994) Frontiersman
- Rachel Carson (1981) Writer and conservationist
- A. P. Carter (1993) Singer and songwriter
- Jimmy Carter (2025) 39th US President
- Maybelle Carter (1993) Country musician
- Sara Carter (1993) Country musician
- Enrico Caruso (1987) Opera tenor
- George Washington Carver (1948) Botanist
- Johnny Cash (2013) Singer
- Nellie Cashman (1994) Gold prospector
- Mary Cassatt (1966) Painter
- Willa Cather (1973) Writer
- George Catlin (1998) Painter
- Wilt Chamberlain (2014) Basketball player
- Carrie Chapman Catt (1948) Suffragist
- Ignacio Chacon (2006) Painter
- Samuel de Champlain (2006) Explorer
- Lon Chaney (1997) Actor
- Lon Chaney Jr. (1997) Actor
- Octave Chanute (1979) Aviation pioneer
- Charlie Chaplin (1994) Actor
- Dave Chapman (2011) Industrial designer
- Ray Charles (2013) Musician
- Samuel Chase (1976) Declaration of Independence signer
- Cesar Chavez (2003) Labor rights leader
- Dennis Chavez (1991) U.S. Senator from New Mexico
- Joyce Chen (2014) Chef, TV personality, cookbook author
- Claire Lee Chennault (1990) World War II General
- Mary Chestnut (1995) Civil War diarist
- Charles W. Chesnutt (2008) Writer
- Julia Child (2014) Chef, TV personality, cookbook author
- Shirley Chisholm (2014) Congresswoman
- Frederic Edwin Church (1998) Painter

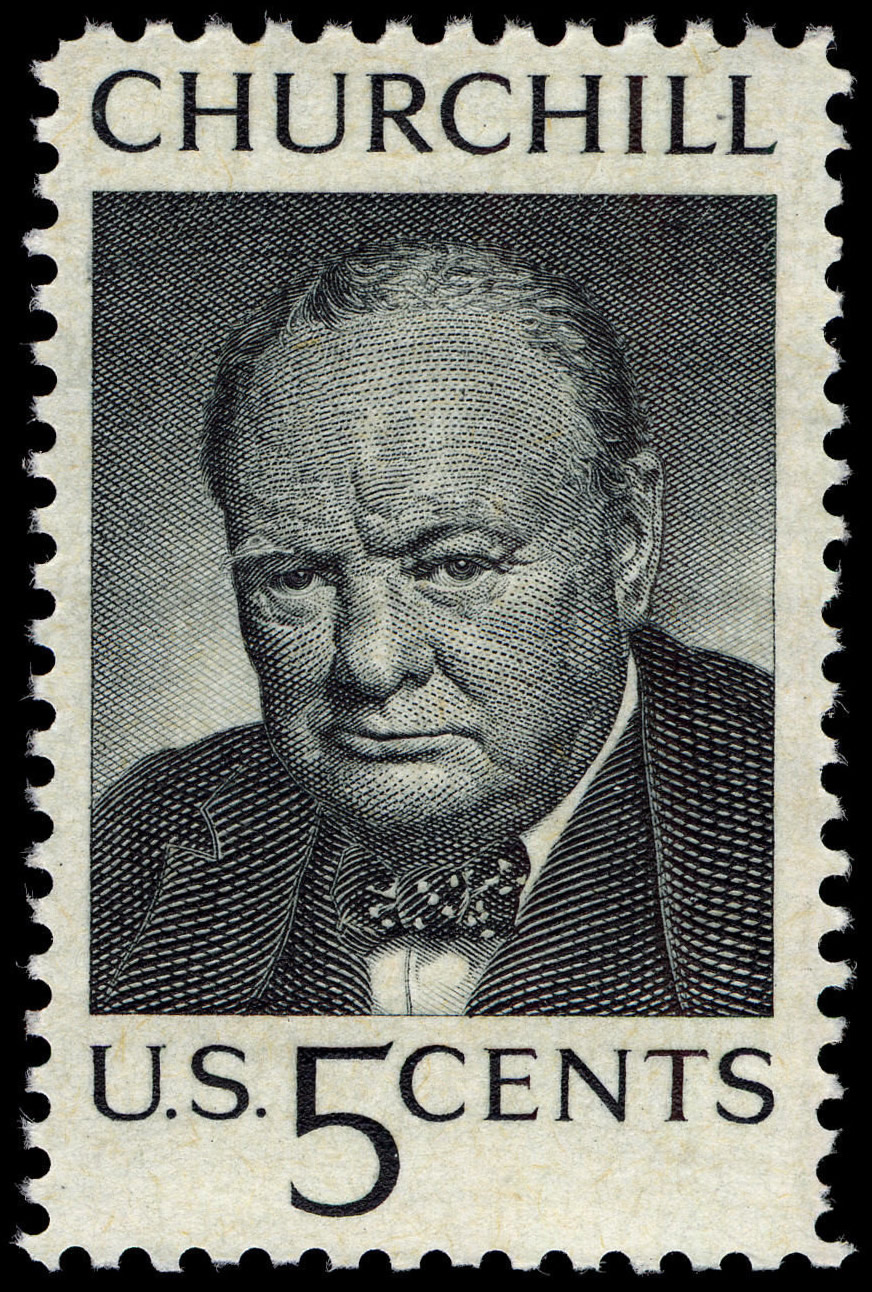
Winston Churchill on a 1965 stamp

- Winston Churchill (1965) British Prime Minister
- Eugenie Clark (2022) American ichthyologist, shark researcher and scientific scuba diver
- Grenville Clark (1985) Lawyer
- George Rogers Clark (1929) Military officer
- William Clark (1954) Explorer

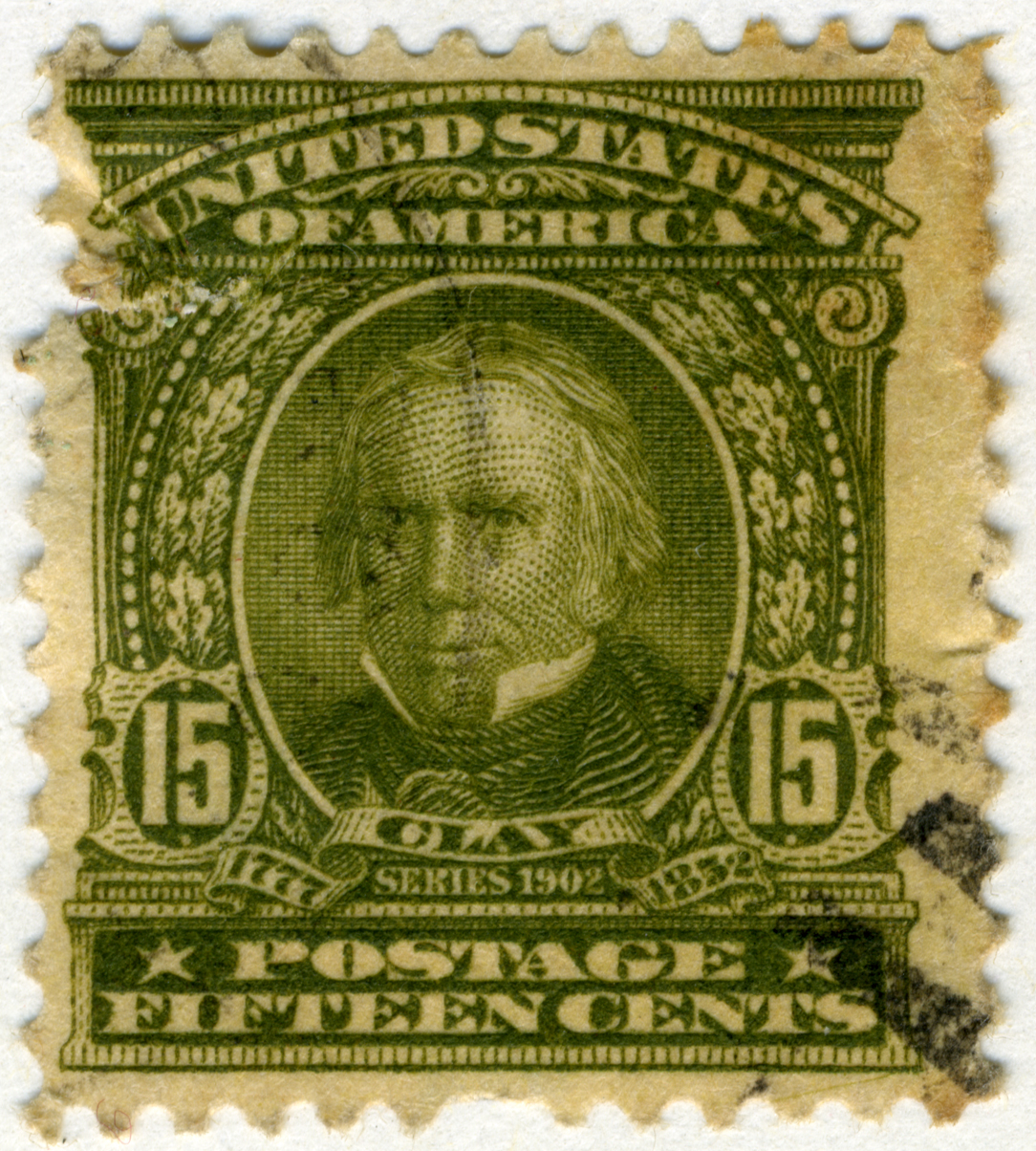
Henry Clay, 1902 stamp

- Henry Clay (1870, 1902) Statesman
- Roberto Clemente (1984 & 2000) Baseball player
- Grover Cleveland (1923) 22nd & 24th president
- J. R. Clifford (2009) Attorney
- Patsy Cline (1993) Country singer
- George Clymer (1976) Declaration of Independence signer
- David Cobb (1976) Congressional Representative, 3rd U.S. Congress
- Ty Cobb (2000) Baseball player
- Alvin Langdon Coburn (2002) Photographer
- Jacqueline Cochran (1996) Aviator
- Mickey Cochrane (2000) Baseball player
- Victoria Codona (2014) Circus performer
- Buffalo Bill Cody (1988) Showman
- Catharine Coffin (2024) Underground Railroad Quaker operative based in Indiana and Ohio
- George M. Cohan (1978) Actor, singer, composer and playwright
- Nat King Cole (1994) Singer
- Bessie Coleman (1995) Aviator
- Eddie Collins (2000) Baseball player
- John Coltrane (1995) Jazz saxophonist and composer
- Christopher Columbus (1893) Explorer
- Maureen Connolly (2019) Tennis player
- James Cook (1978) Explorer
- Calvin Coolidge (1938) 30th president
- Anna Julia Cooper (2009) Civil rights leader
- Gary Cooper (1990, 2009) Actor
- James Fenimore Cooper (1940) Author

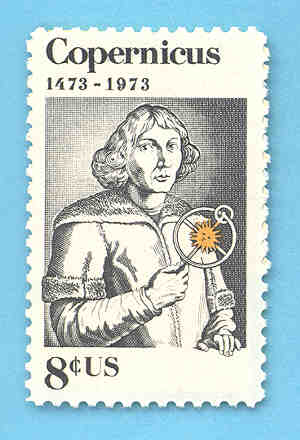
Nicolaus Copernicus on a 1973 stamp

- Nicolaus Copernicus (1973) Astronomer
- John Singleton Copley (1965) Painter
- Gerty Cori (2008) Biochemist
- Dean Cornwell (2001) Illustrator
- Francisco Vásquez de Coronado (1940) Explorer
- Lorenzo Costa (2001) Painter
- Lou Costello (1991) Comedian and actor
- Crazy Horse (1982) Lakota war leader
- Davy Crockett (1967) Alamo defender
- Bing Crosby (1994) Singer and actor
- Jim Crowley (1998) Notre Dame football player
- Celia Cruz (2011) Musician
- E. E. Cummings (2012) Poet
- Imogen Cunningham (2002) Photographer
- Glen Curtiss (1980) Aviator
- Harvey Cushing (1988) Neurosurgeon
- Manasseh Cutler (1937) Northwest Territory pioneer

== D ==
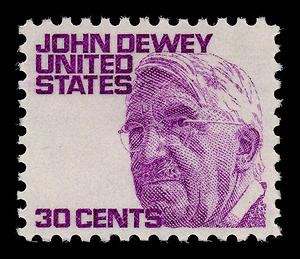
John Dewey on a 1968 stamp

- Daniel Daly (2005) Marine; Medal of Honor recipient

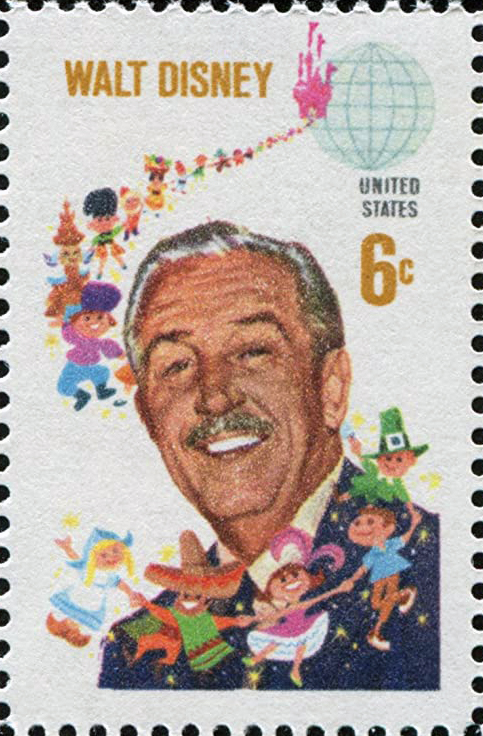
Walt Disney on a 1968 stamp

- Virginia Dare (1937) First child born in the Americas to English parents
- Allison Davis (1994) Educator, anthropologist
- Benjamin Oliver Davis Sr. (1997) Army General
- Bette Davis (2008) Actress
- Jefferson Davis (1970) Confederate president
- Miles Davis (2012) Jazz musician
- Stuart Davis (2013) Modern artist
- Julia de Burgos (2010) Puerto Rican writer and poet
- Agnes de Mille (2004) Choreographer
- Dizzy Dean (2000) Baseball player
- James Dean (1996) Actor
- Stephen Decatur (1937) Navy commodore
- Willem de Kooning (2010) Abstract expressionist artist
- Oscar de la Renta (2017) Fashion designer
- Andrea della Robbia (1978) Sculptor

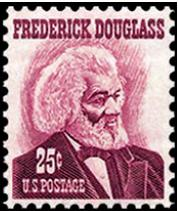
Frederick Douglass on a 1967 stamp

- Jack Dempsey (1998) Boxer
- Charles Demuth (2013) Modern artist
- Tomie dePaola (2023) Children's book author and illustrator
- Donald Deskey (2011) Industrial designer
- George Dewey (1936) Navy Admiral
- John Dewey (1968) Educator
- Emily Dickinson (1971) Poet
- John Dickinson (1976) American lawyer and Governor of Delaware and Pennsylvania
- William Dickson (1996) Motion picture camera inventor
- Everett Dirksen (1981) Senate Minority Leader
- Dorothea Dix (1983) Social reformer
- Joe DiMaggio (2012) Baseball player
- Walt Disney (1968) Motion picture producer, animator
- Larry Doby (2012) Baseball player
- Jimmy Dorsey (1996) Jazz musician and bandleader
- Tommy Dorsey (1996) Jazz musician and bandleader
- Aaron Douglas (2013) Modern artist
- Stephen A. Douglas (1958) Politician
- Frederick Douglass (1967, 2024) Abolitionist
- Arthur Dove (2013) Modern artist
- Charles R. Drew (1981) Surgeon and medical researcher
- Henry Dreyfuss (2011) Industrial designer

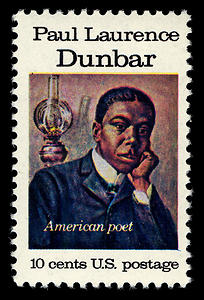
Paul Laurence Dunbar on a 1975 stamp

- W. E. B. Du Bois (1992) Civil Rights advocate
- Marcel Duchamp (2013) Modern Artist
- John Foster Dulles (1960) Secretary of State
- Paul Laurence Dunbar (1975) Poet
- Isadora Duncan (2012) Dancer
- Katherine Dunham (2012) Choreographer
- Harvey Dunn (2001) Illustrator
- Asher Durand (1998) Painter

== E ==
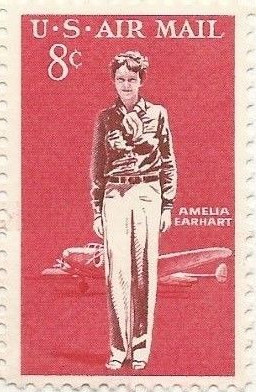
Amelia Earhart on a 1963 stamp

- Eddie Eagan (1990) Olympic athlete
- Thomas Eakins (1967) Painter, sculptor
- Charles and Ray Eames (2008) Industrial design, furniture design
- Amelia Earhart (1963) Aviator
- Wyatt Earp (1994) Lawman
- George Eastman (1954) Roll film inventor
- Thomas Alva Edison (1947) Inventor
- Albert Einstein (1966) Physicist

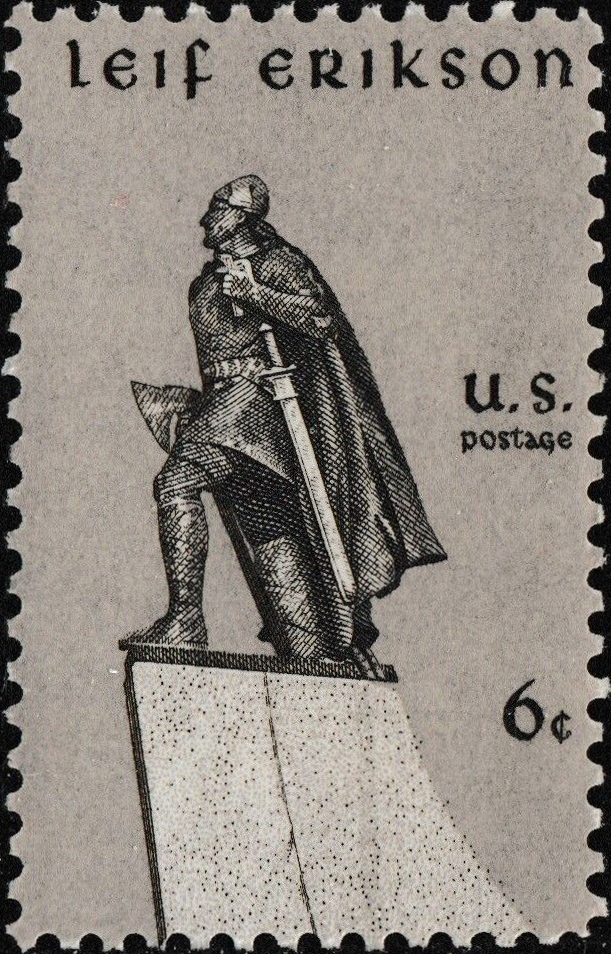
Leif Ericson on a 1968 stamp

- Billy Eisengrein (2002) Ground Zero firefighter
- Dwight D. Eisenhower (1969) 34th president
- Charles William Eliot (1940) President of Harvard University
- T. S. Eliot (1986) Poet
- Edward Kennedy "Duke" Ellington (1986) Jazz musician and composer
- Ralph Ellison (2014) Author and literary critic
- Lincoln Ellsworth (1988) Antarctic explorer
- Ralph Waldo Emerson (1940) Philosopher
- John Ericsson (1926) Engineer and inventor
- Leif Ericson (1968) Explorer
- Jaime Escalante (2016) Educator
- Walker Evans (2002) Photographer
- Medgar Evers (2009) Civil rights leader
- Ray Ewry (1990) Olympic athlete

== F ==
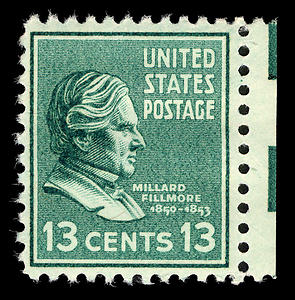
Millard Fillmore on a 1938 stamp

- Douglas Fairbanks (1984) Actor
- Cal Farley (1996) Founder of Boys Ranch
- Philo Farnsworth (1983) Inventor
- David Farragut (1903) Navy admiral
- William Faulkner (1987) Author
- Robert Fawcett (2001) Illustrator
- Edna Ferber (2002) Author
- Perry Ferguson (2003) Motion picture art director
- Enrico Fermi (2001) Physicist
- José Ferrer (2012) Actor
- Richard Feynman (2005) Physicist
- Arthur Fiedler (1997) Conductor
- Dorothy Fields (1996) Librettist and lyricist
- W.C. Fields (1980) Comedian
- Millard Fillmore (1938) 13th president
- Ella Fitzgerald (2007) Jazz singer
- F. Scott Fitzgerald (1996) Author
- James Montgomery Flagg (2001) Illustrator

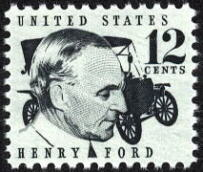
Henry Ford on a 1968 stamp

- Father Edward J. Flanagan (1986) Orphan advocate
- Henry Fonda (2005) Actor
- Lynn Fontanne (1999) Actress
- Betty Ford (2024) First Lady of the United States from 1974 to 1977
- Gerald Ford (2007) 38th President of the United States
- Henry Ford (1968) Industrialist
- John Ford (2012) Motion picture director
- Bob Fosse (2012) Choreographer
- John Foster (1998) Woodcut printmaker

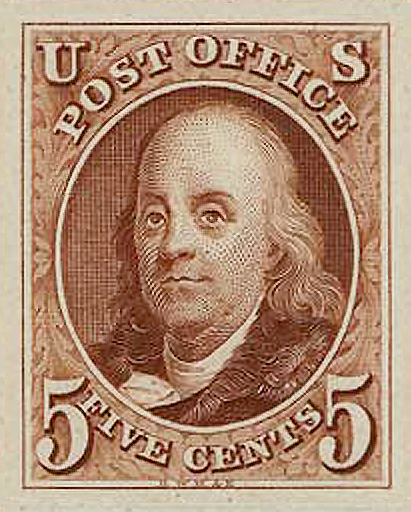
Benjamin Franklin on the first US stamp, 1847

- Rube Foster (2010) Baseball player
- Stephen Foster (1940) Songwriter
- George L. Fox, Chaplain (1st Lt.), U.S. Army (1948)
- Jimmie Foxx (2000) Baseball player
- Francis of Assisi (1982) Catholic saint
- Peter Francisco (1975) Soldier
- Felix Frankfurter (2009) Supreme Court justice
- Benjamin Franklin (1847) 1st Postmaster, statesman, scientist

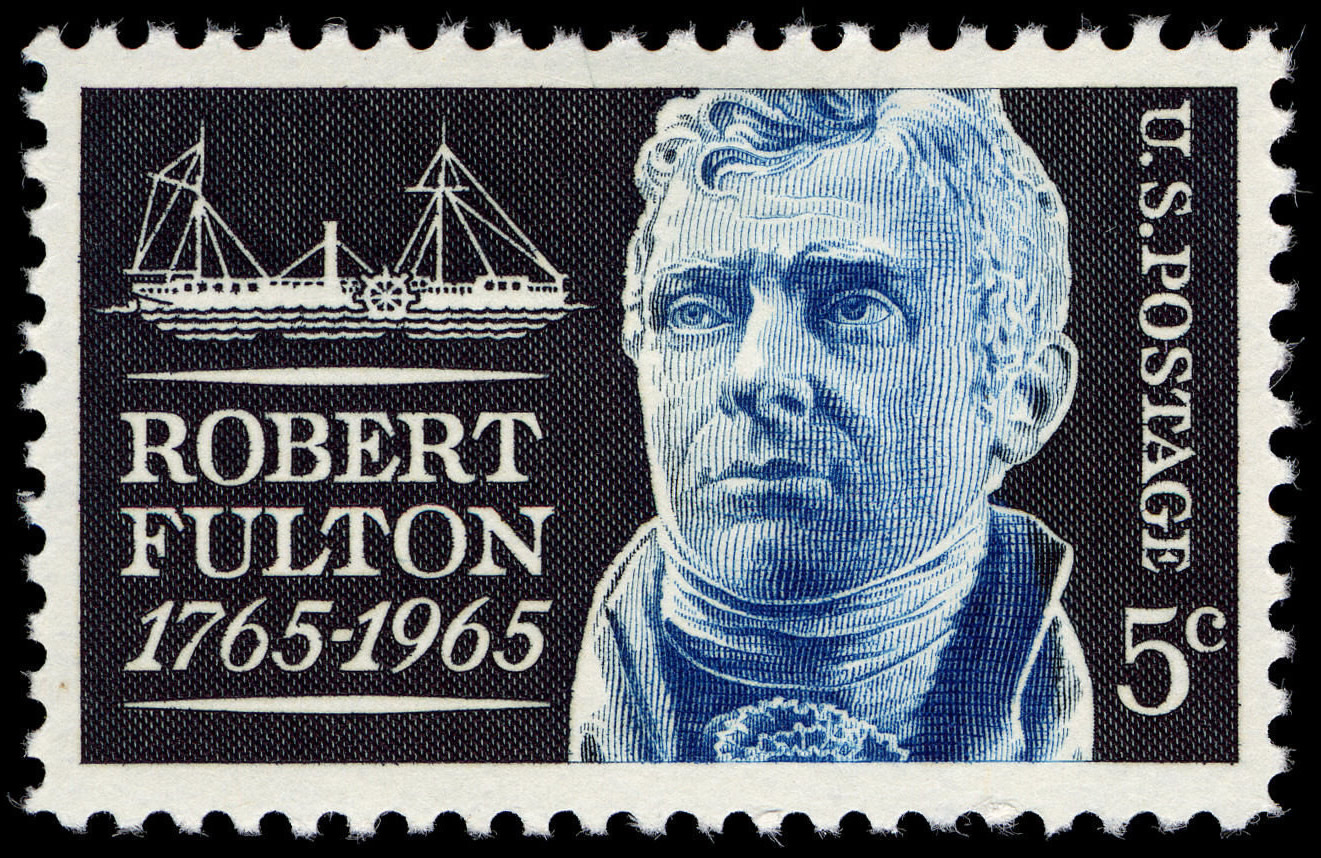
Robert Fulton on a 1965 stamp

- Elizabeth Freake (1998) Subject of portrait by Freake Limner
- Mary Freake (1998) Subject of portrait by Freake Limner
- John C. Fremont (1898) Explorer, US Senator
- Daniel Chester French (1940) Sculptor
- Arthur Burdett Frost (2001) Illustrator
- Robert Frost (1974) Poet
- Buckminster Fuller (2004) Inventor
- Robert Fulton (1909) Steamboat inventor

== G ==
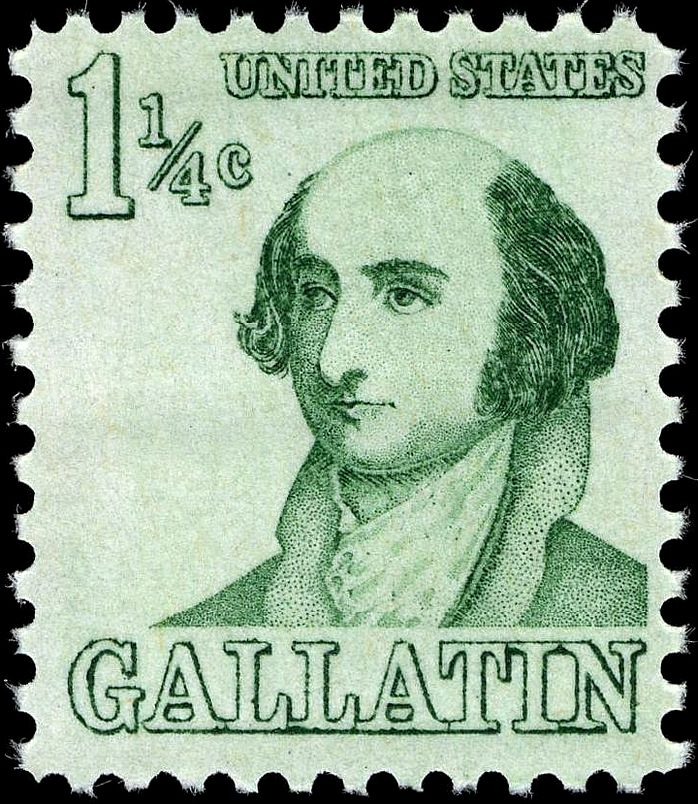
Albert Gallatin on a 1967 stamp

- Ernest J. Gaines (2023) Author
- Albert Gallatin (1967) Secretary of the Treasury
- Thomas H. Gallaudet (1983) Educator
- Bernardo de Gálvez (1980) Spanish Governor of Louisiana
- Mohandas Gandhi (1961) Indian patriot
- Greta Garbo (2005) Actress
- Carlos Gardel (2011) Singer
- James A. Garfield (1882) 20th President
- Giuseppe Garibaldi (1960) Italian patriot
- Judy Garland (1990) Actress
- Erroll Garner (1995) Jazz pianist and composer
- Thomas Garrett (2024) Delaware-based Quaker operative Underground Railroad

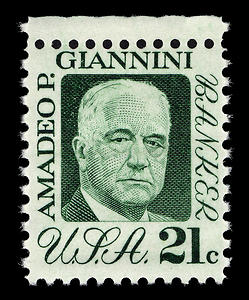
Amadeo P. Giannini on a 1973 stamp

- Marvin Gaye (2019) Singer and songwriter
- Lou Gehrig (1989) Baseball player
- Theodor Seuss Geisel (1999) Author & illustrator
- Martha Gellhorn (2008) Journalist
- Walter F. George (1960)
- Geronimo (1994) Apache leader
- Elbridge Gerry (1976) Declaration of Independence signer
- George Gershwin (1973) Composer and musician
- Ira Gershwin (1999) Lyricist
- Amadeo P. Giannini (1973) Bank of America founder
- Josiah Willard Gibbs (2005) Thermodynamicist
- Josh Gibson (2000) Baseball player

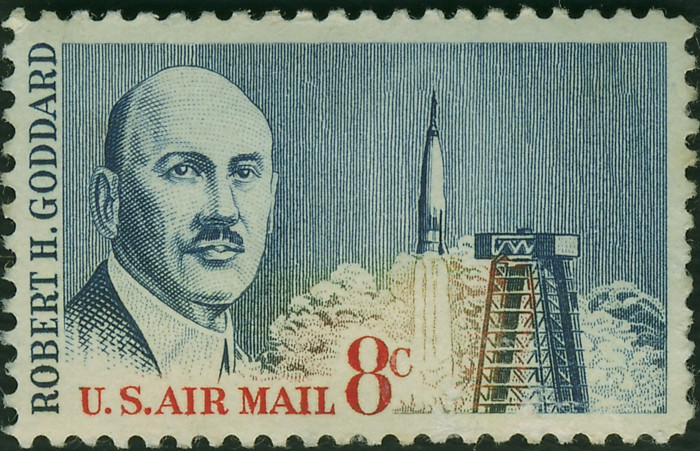
Robert H. Goddard on a 1964 stamp

- Althea Gibson (2013) Tennis player
- John Gilbert (1994) Actor
- Lillian Gilbreth (1984) Industrial and organizational psychologist
- Ruth Bader Ginsburg (2023) 107th Supreme Court Justice
- Jackie Gleason (2009) Comedian
- Robert H. Goddard (1964) Rocket scientist
- Maria Goeppert-Mayer (2011) Physicist
- Samuel Gompers (1950) Labor union leader

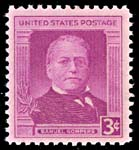
Samuel Gompers on a 1950 stamp

- Alexander D. Goode, Ph.D. (1948) Chaplain (1st Lt.), U.S. Army (1948)
- Benny Goodman (1996) Big band leader
- Charles Goodnight (1994) Rancher
- Arshile Gorky (2010) Abstract expressionist artist
- Jan Gossaert (2002) Painter
- Adolph Gottlieb (2010) Abstract expressionist artist
- Louis Moreau Gottschalk (1997) Composer
- Katharine Graham (2022) Newspaper publisher
- Martha Graham (2004) Choreographer
- Red Grange (2003) Football player
- Cary Grant (2002) Actor
- Ulysses S. Grant (1890) 18th President
- François Joseph Paul Grasse (1931) Revolutionary War Admiral

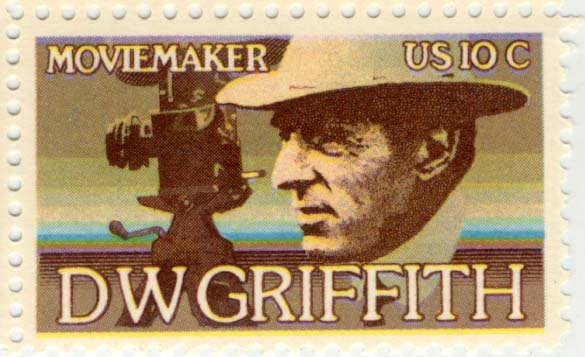
David Wark Griffith on a 1975 stamp

- Asa Gray (2011) Botanist
- Horace Greeley (1961) Newspaper publisher
- Adolphus Greely (1986) Polar explorer
- Hank Greenberg (2006) Baseball player
- Nathanael Greene (1936) Military officer
- D. W. Griffith (1975) Filmmaker
- Ferde Grofé (1997) Composer
- Lefty Grove (2000) Baseball player
- Woody Guthrie (1998) Singer-songwriter

== H ==
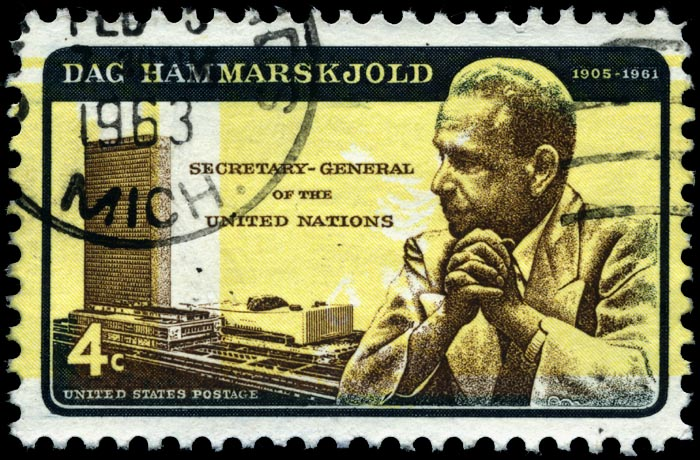
Dag Hammarskjöld on a 1962 stamp

- Philip Habib (2006) Diplomat
- George Halas (1997) Football coach
- Nathan Hale (1925) Revolutionary War officer
- Bill Haley (1993) Rock and roll music pioneer
- Fannie Lou Hamer (2009) Civil rights leader
- Alexander Hamilton (1956) 1st Treasury Secretary
- Alice Hamilton (1995) Public health and social reformer

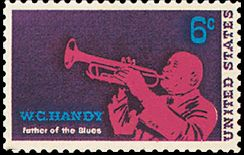
William Christopher Handy on a 1969 stamp

- Dag Hammarskjöld (1962) Explorer
- Oscar Hammerstein II (1999) Librettist
- Winfield Scott Hancock (1995) Civil War general
- William Christopher Handy (1969) Blues musician and composer
- John Hanson (1981) Founding Father
- Yip Harburg (2005) Lyricist
- Warren G. Harding (1925) 29th President
- Oliver Hardy (1991) Actor
- William Harnett (1969) Painter
- Joel Chandler Harris (1948) Writer
- Patricia Roberts Harris (2000) Presidential Cabinet member, ambassador
- Benjamin Harrison (1902) 23rd President

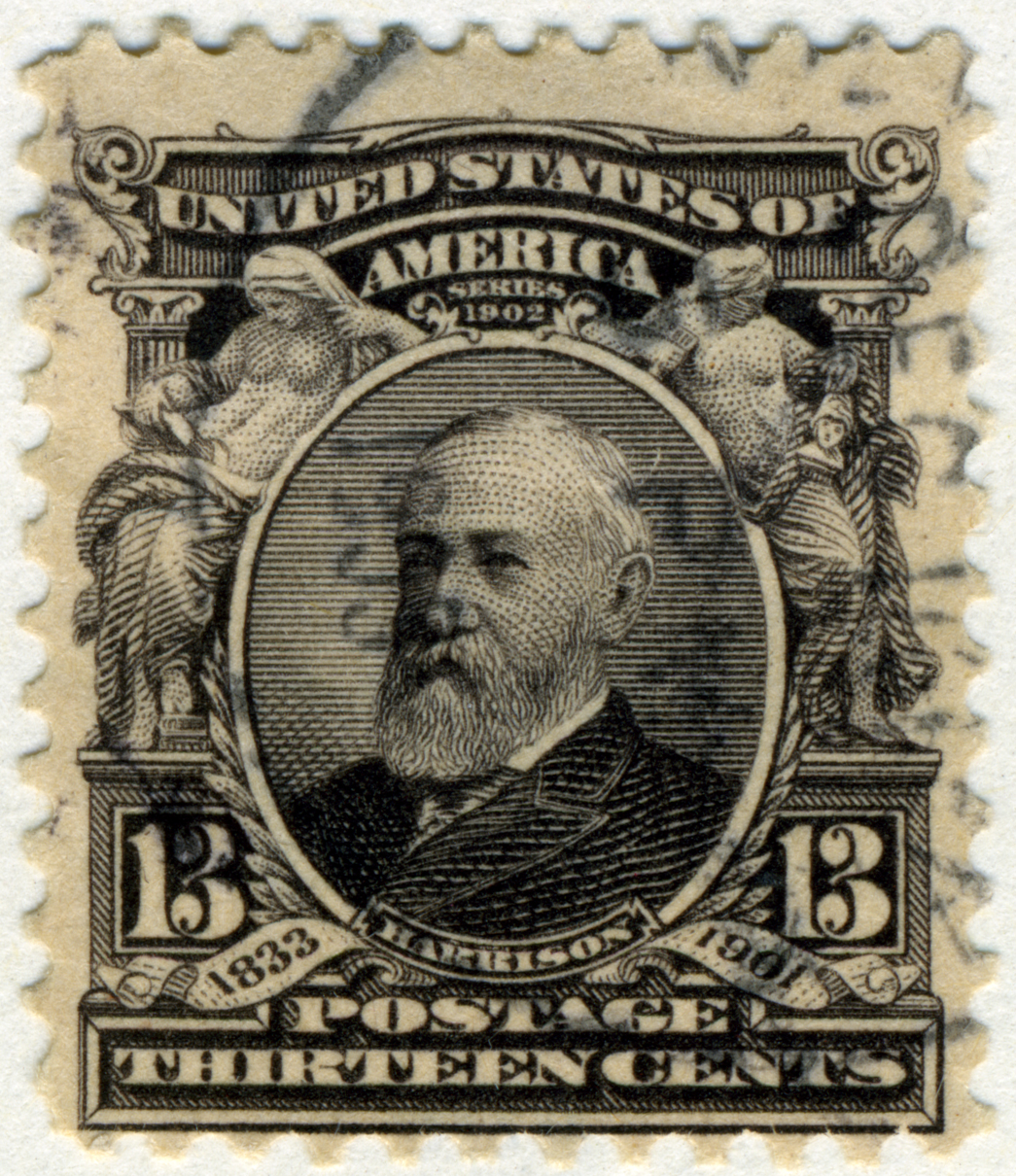
Benjamin Harrison on a 1902 stamp

- William Henry Harrison (1938, 1950) 9th President, 1st Governor of Indiana Territory
- Lorenz Hart (1999) Broadway lyricist
- Moss Hart (2004) Playwright
- William S. Hart (2010) Actor
- Bret Harte (1987) Writer
- Marsden Hartley (2013) Modern artist
- John Harvard (1986) Philanthropist
- Laura Haviland (2024) Underground Railroad Michigan-based Quaker operative
- Josiah Johnson Hawes (2002) Photographer
- Coleman Hawkins (1995) Jazz saxophonist
- Nathaniel Hawthorne (1983) Author
- Lewis Hayden (2024) Underground Railroad Boston-based operative
- Robert Hayden (2012) Poet
- Helen Hayes (2011) Actress
- Rutherford B. Hayes (1922) 19th President
- Mary Ludwig Hays (Molly Pitcher) (1928) Battlefield volunteer
- Martin Johnson Heade (2004) Painter
- Dorothy Height (2017) Civil rights and women's rights activist
- John Held Jr. (2001) Illustrator
- Ernest Hemingway (1989) Author
- Jimi Hendrix (2014) Musician
- O. Henry (2012) Author
- Patrick Henry (1958) Founding Father
- Jim Henson (2005) Muppets creator
- Matthew Henson (1986) Arctic explorer
- Audrey Hepburn (2003) Actress
- Katharine Hepburn (2010) Actress
- Victor Herbert (1940) Composer
- Bernard Herrmann (1999) Composer
- John Hersey (2008) Journalist
- Milton Hershey (1995) Chocolatier
- Theodore Hesburgh (2017) Educator and civil rights advocate
- Charlton Heston (2014) Actor
- Joseph Hewes (1976) Declaration of Independence signer
- Wild Bill Hickok (1994) Gunman
- Marguerite Higgins (2002) Journalist
- Lewis Hine (2002) Photographer

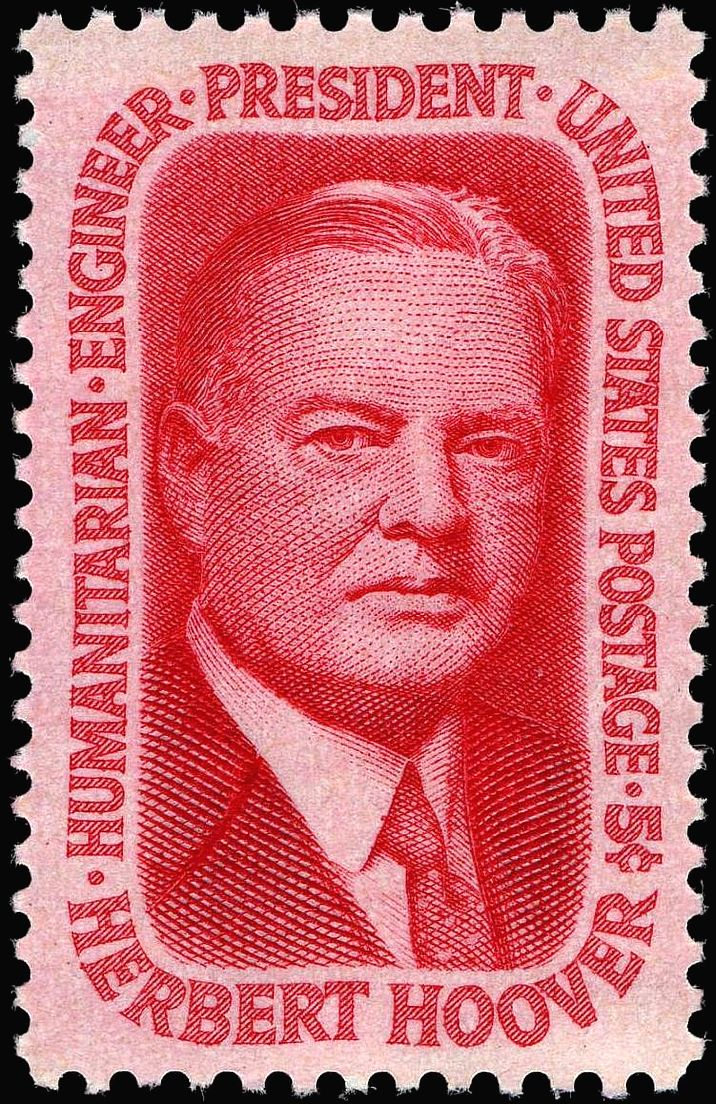
Herbert Hoover, on a 1965 stamp

- Gregory Hines (2019) Dancer, actor, singer, and choreographer
- John L. Hines (2000) World War I General
- Alfred Hitchcock (1998) Motion picture director
- James Hoban (1981) Architect
- Oveta Culp Hobby (2011) Women's Army Corps officer
- Hans Hofmann (2010) Abstract expressionist painter
- Hollow Horn Bear (1923) Lakota chief
- Billie Holiday (1994) Jazz singer
- Buddy Holly (1993) Musician
- Oliver Wendell Holmes (1968) US Supreme Court Justice
- Winslow Homer (1962) Painter
- Herbert Hoover (1965) 31st president
- Bob Hope (2009) Comedian
- Johns Hopkins (1989) Philanthropist
- Mark Hopkins (1940) College president
- Edward Hopper (1970) Painter
- Lena Horne (2018) Singer and actress
- Rogers Hornsby (2000) Baseball player

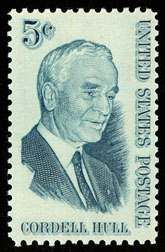
Cordell Hull on a 1964 stamp

- Harry Houdini (2002) Magician
- Charles Hamilton Houston (2009) Civil rights leader
- Sam Houston (1963) Soldier, statesman
- Elias Howe (1940) Inventor
- Julia Ward Howe (1987) Poet and abolitionist
- Howlin' Wolf (1994) Blues singer and musician
- Edwin Hubble (2000) Astronomer
- Charles Evans Hughes (1962) Chief Justice of Supreme Court
- Langston Hughes (2002) Author
- Cordell Hull (1963) Secretary of State
- Hubert Humphrey (1991) 38th Vice President
- Ruby Hurley (2009) Civil rights leader
- Zora Neale Hurston (2003) Author
- John Huston (2012) Motion picture director

== I ==
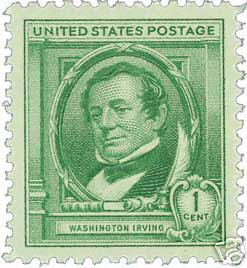
Washington Irving on a 1940 stamp

- Gwen Ifill (2020) Journalist
- Washington Irving (1940) Author
- Isabella I (1893) Spanish monarch
- Charles Ives (1997) Composer
- Frederic Ives (1996) Inventor

== J ==
- Andrew Jackson (1861) 7th president

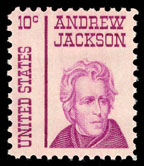
Andrew Jackson on a 1967 stamp

- Mahalia Jackson (1998) Gospel singer
- Thomas "Stonewall" Jackson (1937) Confederate Army General
- Harriet Jacobs (2024) Underground Railroad, wrote slavery memoir
- Henry James (2016) Writer
- John Jay (1958) Supreme Court Chief Justice
- Robinson Jeffers (1973) Poet
- Thomas Jefferson (1861, 1904, 1986) 3rd president
- Jesus (1966) Christianity founder
- Sarah Orne Jewett (2026) American novelist

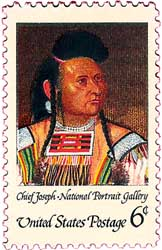
Chief Joseph on a 1968 stamp

- Andrew Johnson (1938) 17th President
- George Johnson (2002) Ground Zero firefighter
- James P. Johnson (1995) Pianist and composer
- James Weldon Johnson (1988) Writer
- John H. Johnson (2012) Publisher
- Joshua Johnson (1998) Painter
- Lady Bird Johnson (2012) First Lady
- Lyndon B. Johnson (1973) 36th president
- Robert Johnson (1994) Blues musician and songwriter
- Walter Johnson (2000) Baseball player
- William Johnson (artist) (2012) Artist
- Joseph E. Johnston (1995) Confederate general
- Al Jolson (1994) Entertainer
- John Paul Jones (1936) Revolutionary War Naval Captain
- Bobby Jones (1981) Golfer
- Janis Joplin (2014) Singer
- Scott Joplin (1983) Ragtime composer
- Barbara Jordan (2011) Congresswoman
- Louis Jordan (2008) Musician/singer
- Chief Joseph (1968) Nez Perce warrior
- Percy Lavon Julian (1993) Chemist
- Ernest Just (1996) Biologist

== K ==
- Duke Kahanamoku (2002) Surfer, swimmer
- Frida Kahlo (2001) Painter

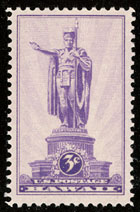
Kamehameha I of Hawaii on a 1937 stamp

- Kamehameha I of Hawaii (1937) Hawaiian King
- Elisha Kent Kane (1986) Polar explorer
- Boris Karloff (1997) Actor
- Theodore von Kármán (1992) Mathematician, aerospace engineer, and physicist
- Gertrude Käsebier (2002) Photographer
- Stephen Watts Kearny (1946) Mexican American War officer
- Buster Keaton (1994) Actor and filmmaker
- Helen Keller (1980) Author and activist
- Ellsworth Kelly (2019) Painter
- Grace Kelly (1993) Actress and princess of Monaco
- John F. Kennedy (1964) 35th President
- Robert F. Kennedy (1979) U.S. Attorney General
- Rockwell Kent (2001) Illustrator
- Jerome Kern (1985) Composer
- André Kertész (2002) Hungarian photographer
- Francis Scott Key (1948) U.S. national anthem writer
- Martin Luther King Jr. (1979) Civil Rights advocate
- Franz Kline (1998) Painter
- Henry Knox (1985) 1st Secretary of War
- Erich Wolfgang Korngold (1999) Composer
- Tadeusz Kościuszko (1933) Polish military engineer
- Lajos Kossuth (1958) Hungarian patriot

== L ==
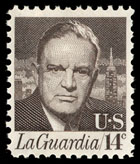
Fiorello La Guardia on a 1972 stamp

- Marquis de Lafayette (1952) Revolutionary War General
- Fiorello La Guardia (1972) Politician
- William Lambert (2024) Underground Railroad Detroit-based operative
- Sidney Lanier (1972) Poet and author

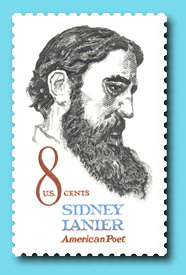
Sidney Lanier on a 1972 stamp

- Dorothea Lange (2002) Photographer
- Samuel Langley (1988) Inventor
- Mary Lasker (2009) Philanthropist
- Frank Laubach (1984) Missionary
- Stan Laurel (1991) Actor and comedian
- Elmer Layden (1998) Notre Dame football player
- Ursula K. Le Guin (2021) Author
- Huddie Ledbetter (a.k.a. Lead Belly; 1998) Blues singer, musician, and songwriter
- Bruce Lee (2026) Martial artist and actor
- Jason Lee (1948) Oregon Territory missionary

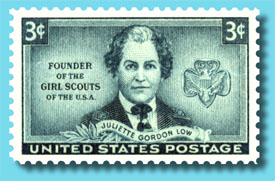
Juliette Gordon Low on a 1948 stamp

- Richard Henry Lee (1976) Declaration of Independence signer
- Robert E. Lee (1955) Confederate General
- Lillian Leitzel (2014) Circus gymnast
- John A. Lejeune (2005) Marine Corps Commandant
- John Lennon (2018) Musician and songwriter
- Ponce de Leon (1982) Explorer and conquistador
- Alan Jay Lerner (1999) Lyricist and Librettist
- Denise Levertov (2012) Poet
- Edmonia Lewis (2022) American sculptor 1844-1907
- Edna Lewis (2014) Chef, cookbook author
- John Lewis (2023) Civil Rights Leader

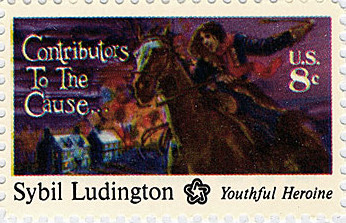
Sybil Ludington on a 1975 stamp

- Meriwether Lewis (1954) Explorer
- Sinclair Lewis (1985) Author
- Joseph Christian Leyendecker (2001) Illustrator
- Roy Lichtenstein (2023) Pop artist
- José Limón (2012) Choreographer
- Abraham Lincoln (1866, 1954) 16th president
- Tad Lincoln (1984) son of Abraham Lincoln
- Charles Lindbergh (1927) Aviator
- Walter Lippmann (1985) Journalist
- Robert R. Livingston (1904) Politician and diplomat
- Harold Lloyd (1994) Silent film star.
- Belva Lockwood (1986) Suffragette
- Frank Loesser (1999) Songwriter
- Frederick Loewe (1999) Composer
- Raymond Loewy (2011) Industrial designer
- Jermain Loguen (2024) Underground Railroad operative based in Syracuse New York
- Vince Lombardi (1997) Football coach
- Jack London (1986) Author
- Crawford W. Long (1940) Physician
- Hillary Long (2014) Circus performer
- Henry Wadsworth Longfellow (1940) Poet
- Louis XVI (1978) King of France
- Joe Louis (1993) Boxer
- Juliette Gordon Low (1948) Founder of Girl Scouts of the USA
- James Russell Lowell (1940) Poet
- Henry R. Luce (1998) Publisher
- Sybil Ludington (1975) Apocryphal Revolutionary War messenger
- Bela Lugosi (1997) Actor
- Bernardino Luini (2007) Painter
- Alfred Lunt (1999) Actor
- Martin Luther (1983) Protestant Reformation leader
- Mary Lyon (1987) Educator

== M ==
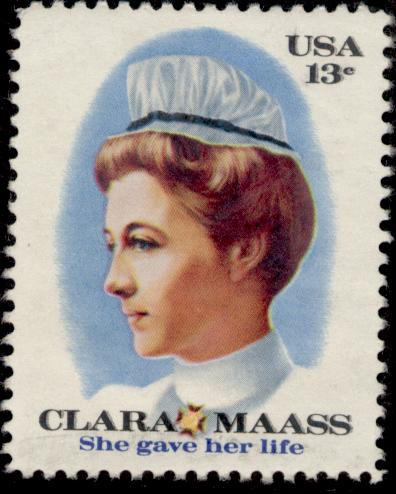
Clara Maass, on a 1976 stamp

- Clara Maass (1976) Nurse
- Douglas MacArthur (1971) Army General
- Edward MacDowell (1940) Composer
- Dolley Madison (1980) First Lady
- Helene Madison (1990) Olympic swimmer
- James Madison (1894, 1938, 2001) 4th president
- Ramon Magsaysay (1957) Philippine president
- Henry Mancini (2004) Composer

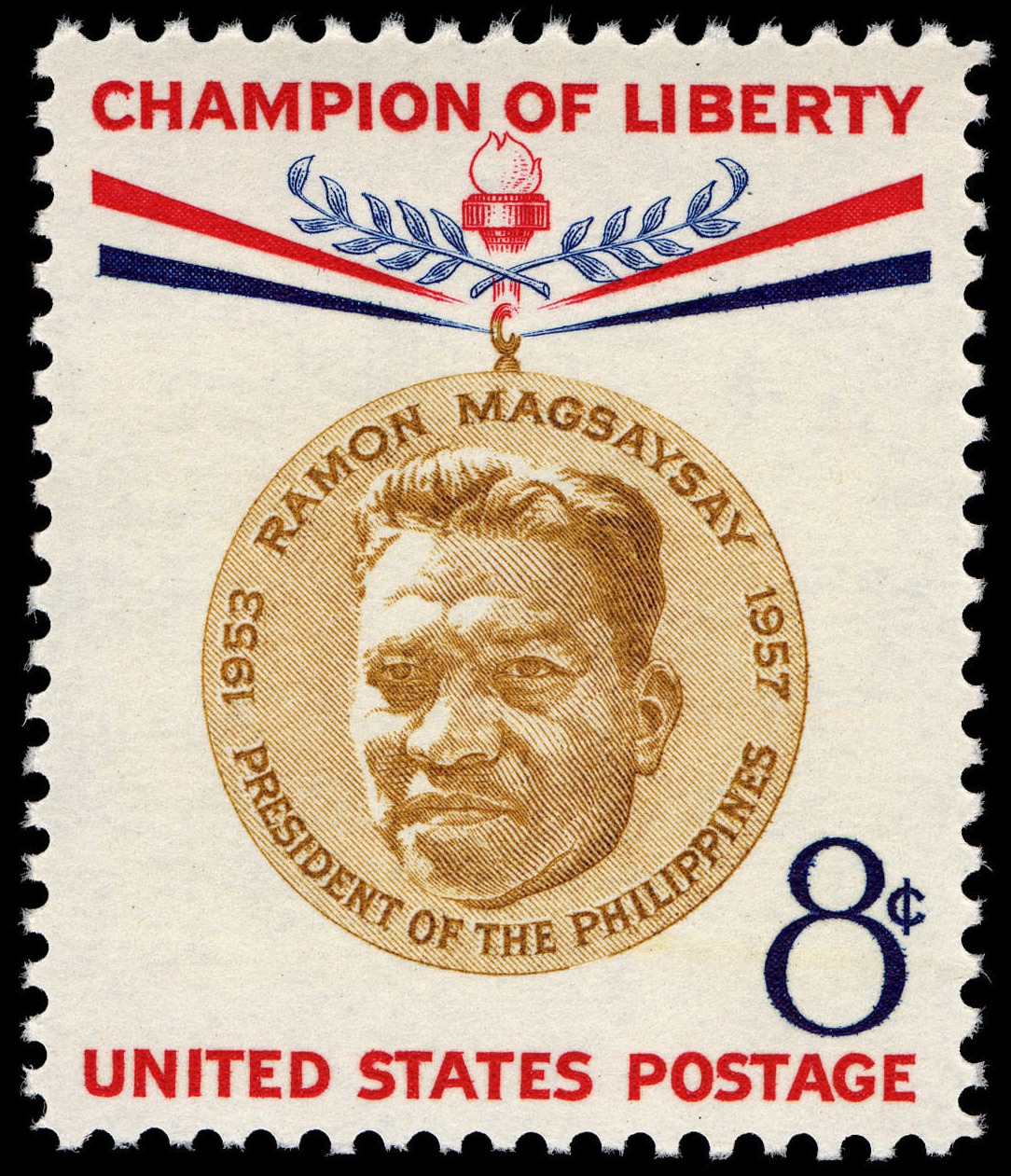
Ramon Magsaysay, on a 1957 stamp

- C.G.E. Mannerheim (1960) Finnish president
- Mickey Mantle (2006) Baseball player
- Rocky Marciano (1999) Boxer
- John Marin (2013) Modern artist
- Roger Maris (1999) Baseball player
- Jacques Marquette (1898, 1968) Explorer
- George Catlett Marshall (1965) Secretary of State, Army general

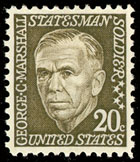
George Catlett Marshall on a 1967 stamp

- John Marshall (1958) Supreme Court Chief Justice
- Thurgood Marshall (2003) Supreme Court Justice
- Roberta Martin (1998) Gospel singer, musician, and songwriter

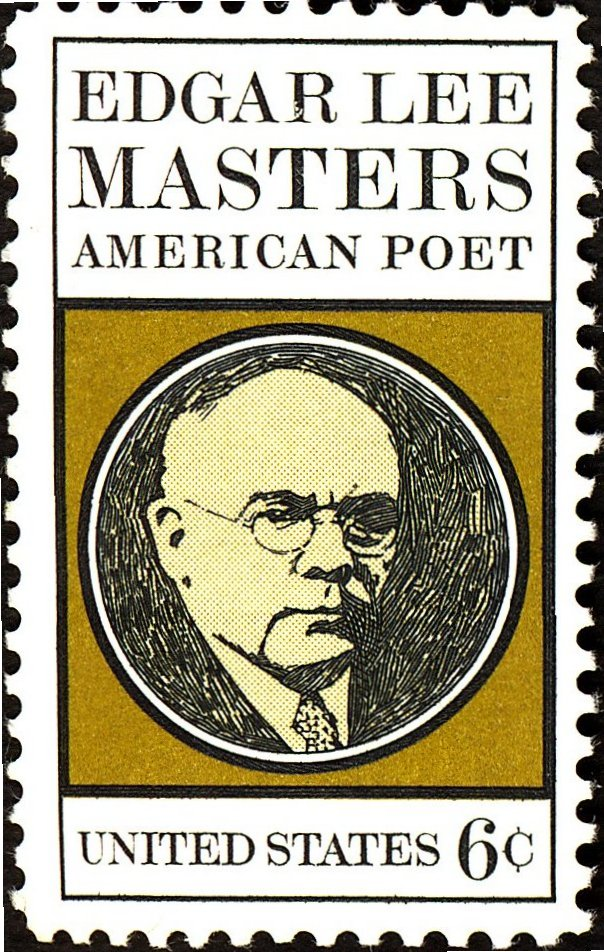
Edgar Lee Masters on a 1970 stamp

- Mary (The Madonna) (1966) Central figure in Christianity
- Groucho Marx (2009) Comedian
- Tomáš Masaryk (1960) President of Czechoslovakia
- George Mason (1981) Founding Father
- Edgar Lee Masters (1970) Poet
- Bat Masterson (1994) Lawman
- Christy Mathewson (2000) Baseball player
- Jan Matzeliger (1991) Inventor
- Bill Mauldin (2010) Cartoonist
- Charles Horace Mayo (1964) Physician, co-founder of the Mayo Clinic
- William James Mayo (1964) Physician, co-founder of the Mayo Clinic
- Willie Mays (2027) Baseball player, New York Giants outfielder
- Philip Mazzei (1980) Revolutionary War patriot

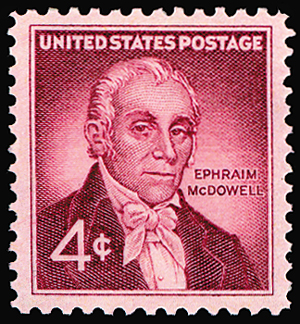
Ephraim McDowell, on a 1959 stamp

- Ephraim McDowell (1959) Surgeon
- Barbara McClintock (2005) Geneticist
- John McCloy (2010) Navy sailor
- John McCormack (1984) Tenor
- Cyrus Hall McCormick (1940) Mechanical reaper inventor
- Hattie McDaniel (2006) Actress
- Thomas MacDonough (1937) Navy commodore
- William McKinley 25th President

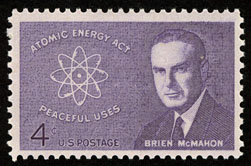
Brien McMahon on a 1962 stamp

- Brien McMahon (1962) Atomic Energy Act author
- Neysa McMein (2001) Illustrator
- Clyde McPhatter (1993) R&B singer
- Dan McWilliams (2002) Ground Zero firefighter
- Margaret Mead (1998) Anthropologist
- George Meany (1994) Labor union leader
- Andrew W. Mellon (1955) Businessman and politician
- Herman Melville (1984) Author
- Lydia Mendoza (2013) Guitarist and singer
- Johnny Mercer (1996) Songwriter
- Ottmar Mergenthaler (1996) Inventor
- Ethel Merman (1994) Actress and singer
- Moina Michael (1948) Originator of memorial poppies
- Oscar Micheaux (2010) Motion picture director
- James Michener (2008) Writer
- Arthur Middleton (1976) Declaration of Independence signer
- Harvey Milk (2014) Politician
- Edna St. Vincent Millay (1981) Poet
- Don Miller (1998) Football player
- Doris Miller (2010) Navy veteran
- Glenn Miller (1996) Big band leader
- Robert Millikan (1982) Physicist
- Charles Mingus (1995) Jazz bassist and composer
- Carmen Miranda (2011) Singer
- Billy Mitchell (1999) Air Force general
- Joan Mitchell (2010) Abstract expressionist artist
- Margaret Mitchell (1986) Author
- Tom Mix (2010) Actor
- Lorenzo Monaco (2004) Painter
- Thelonious Monk (1995) Jazz pianist and composer
- James Monroe (1904) 5th President
- Marilyn Monroe (1995) Actor
- John Bassett Moore (1965) Judge, Assistant Secretary of State
- Clayton Moore (2009) Actor
- Marianne Moore (1990) Poet
- Thomas Moran (1998) Artist
- Justin S. Morrill (1999) Senator
- Lewis Morris (1976) Declaration of Independence signer
- Robert Morris (financier) (1952) Declaration of Independence signatory
- George Morrison (2022) Artist
- Toni Morrison (2023) Author
- Samuel F. B. Morse (1940) Telegraph inventor

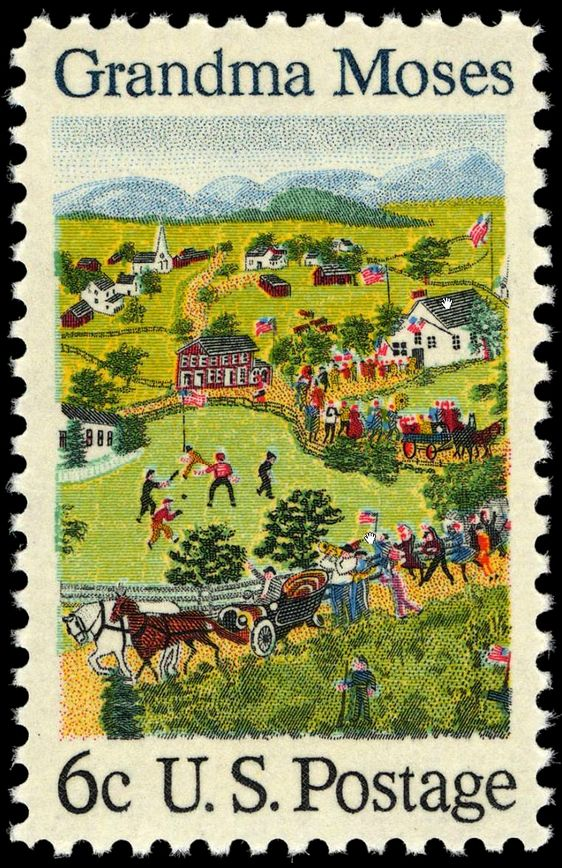
Grandma Moses on a 1969 stamp

- Jelly Roll Morton (originally Ferdinand J. La Menthe) (1995) Jazz musician and composer
- Julius Sterling Morton (1932) Arbor Day founder
- Anna Mary Robertson Moses (a.k.a. Grandma Moses, 1969) Painter
- Horace Moses (1984) Founder of Junior Achievement
- Robert Motherwell (2010) Abstract expressionist artist
- Constance Baker Motley (2024) American jurist and politician
- Lucretia Mott (1948) Civil Rights advocate
- John Muir (1964) Conservationist
- Peter Müller-Munk (2011) Industrial designer
- Luis Muñoz Marín (1980) First democratically elected governor of Puerto Rico
- Audie L. Murphy (2000) World War II soldier, actor
- Gerald Murphy (2013) Modern artist
- Robert Daniel Murphy (2006) Diplomat
- Edward R. Murrow (1994) Journalist
- Eadweard Muybridge (1996) Photographer

== N ==
- Bronko Nagurski (2003) Football player

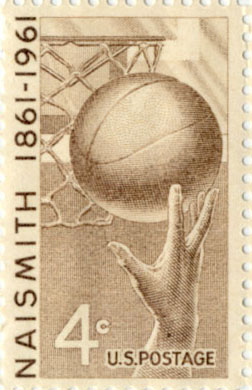
James Naismith on a 1961 stamp

- James Naismith (1961) Basketball inventor
- Ogden Nash (2002) Poet
- Harriet Nelson (2009) Actress
- Ozzie Nelson (2009) Actor
- Thomas Nelson Jr. (1976) Declaration of Independence signatory
- Louise Nevelson (2000) Sculptor
- Ernie Nevers (2003) Football player

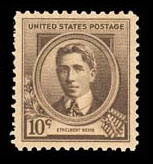
Ethelbert Nevin on a 1940 stamp

- Ethelbert Nevin (1940) Composer
- Alfred Newman (1999) Composer
- Barnett Newman (2010) Abstract expressionist artist
- Paul Newman (2015) Actor
- Chester Nimitz (1985) Naval officer
- Richard Nixon (1995) 37th President
- Alfred Nobel (2001) Chemist, inventor and philanthropist
- Isamu Noguchi (2004) Sculptor
- George Norris (1961) U.S. Senator from Nebraska
- Eliot Noyes (2011) Industrial designer

== O ==
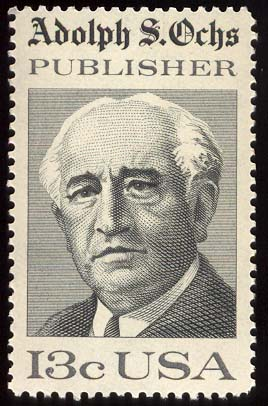
Adolph S. Ochs on a 1976 stamp

- Annie Oakley (1994) Sharpshooter
- Adolph S. Ochs (1976) New York Times publisher
- Severo Ochoa (2011) Biochemist
- Flannery O'Connor (2015) Writer
- William Butler Ogden (1944) Railroad tycoon, first Mayor of Chicago
- James Edward Oglethorpe (1933) Georgia founder

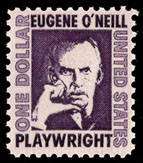
Eugene O’Neill on a 1967 stamp

- Georgia O'Keeffe (1996, 2013) Painter
- Frederick Law Olmsted (1999) Landscape architect
- Eugene O'Neill (1973) Playwright
- Rose O'Neill (2001) Illustrator
- Eugene Ormandy (1997) Conductor
- Timothy O'Sullivan (2002) Photographer
- Mel Ott (2006) Baseball player
- Francis Ouimet (1988) Golfer
- Mary White Ovington (2009) Civil rights leader
- Jesse Owens (1990) Track & field athlete

== P ==
- Ignacy Jan Paderewski (1960) Polish Prime Minister
- Satchel Paige (2000) Baseball player

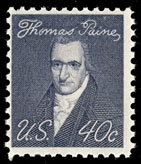
Thomas Paine on a 1969 stamp

- Thomas Paine (1965) Journalist
- Arnold Palmer (2020) Golfer
- Nathaniel Palmer (1988) Antarctic explorer
- Robert Panara (2017) Educator, deaf culture studies pioneer
- George Papanicolaou (1978) Cytologist
- Al Parker (2001) Illustrator
- Charlie Parker (1995) Jazz musician and composer
- Dorothy Parker (1992) Writer
- Francis Parkman (1967) Historian
- Rosa Parks (2013) Civil rights activist
- Maxfield Parrish (2001) Illustrator

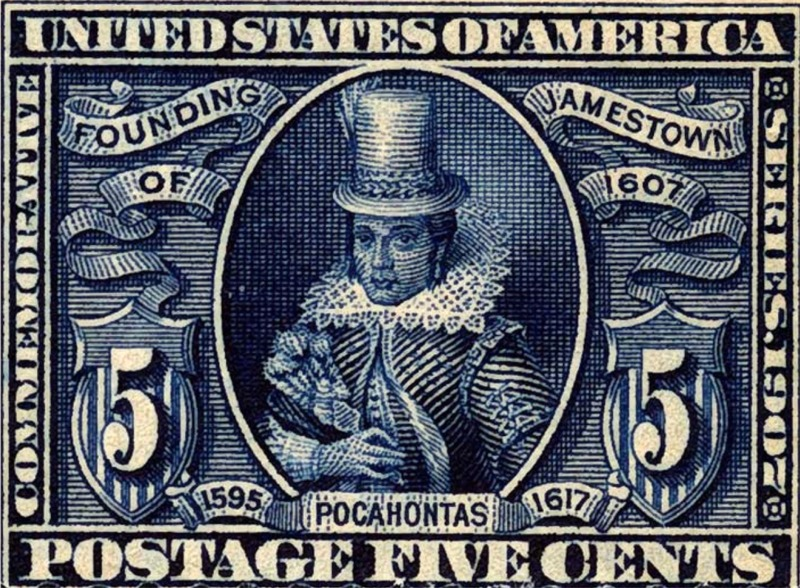
Pocahontas on a 1907 stamp

- Alden Partridge (1985) Educator
- George S. Patton Jr. (1953) World War II Army General
- Alice Paul (1995) Suffragist and feminist
- Linus Pauling (2008) Chemist
- Ethel L. Payne (2002) Journalist
- Rembrandt Peale (1998) Artist
- Robert Edwin Peary (1959) Arctic explorer
- Gregory Peck, (2011) Actor
- Phoebe Pember (1995) Nurse
- Ammi Phillips (1998) Painter
- William Penn (1932) Pennsylvania founder
- Claude Pepper (2000) Senator

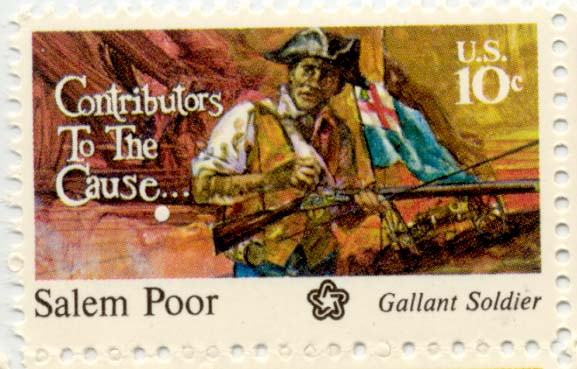
Salem Poor on a 1975 stamp

- Frances Perkins (1980) Secretary of Labor
- Matthew Perry (1953) Navy Commodore
- Oliver Hazard Perry (1870) Navy officer
- General John Pershing (1961) General of the Armies
- Coles Phillips (2001) Illustrator
- Édith Piaf (2012) Singer
- Bill Pickett (1994) Cowboy
- Franklin Pierce (1938) 14th president
- William T. Piper (1991) Aviation executive
- ZaSu Pitts (1994) Actress
- Sylvia Plath (2012) Poet
- Pocahontas (1907) Algonquian princess
- Edgar Allan Poe (1949) Author

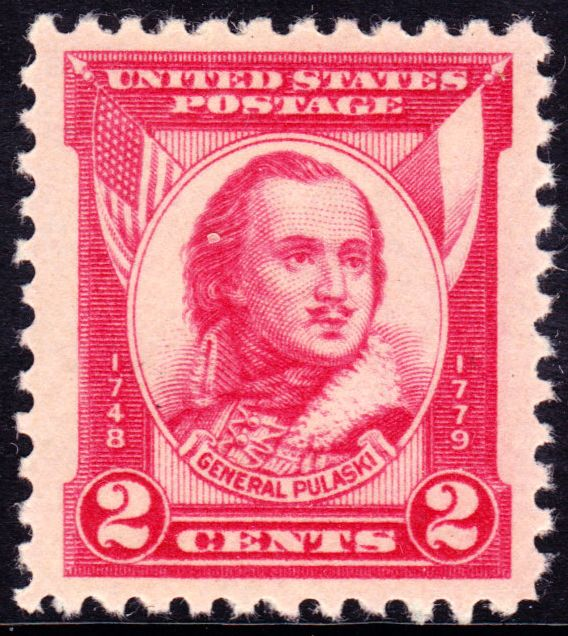
Kazimierz Pułaski on a 1931 stamp

- Jean Baptiste Pointe du Sable (1987) Founder of Chicago
- George Polk (2008) Journalist
- Clark V. Poling (1948) Chaplain
- James K. Polk (1938) 11th president
- Jackson Pollock (1999) Painter
- Lily Pons (1997) Soprano
- Rosa Ponselle (1997) Soprano

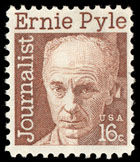
Ernest Taylor Pyle on a 1971 stamp

- Salem Poor (1975) Revolutionary War soldier
- Cole Porter (1991) Songwriter
- David D. Porter (1937) Civil War naval officer
- Katherine Anne Porter (2006) Author
- Emily Post (1998) Author
- Wiley Post (1979) Aviator
- John Wesley Powell (1969) Explorer
- Harriet Powers (2026) Artist
- Albert Préjean (2008) Actor
- Elvis Presley (1993, 2015) Rock and roll singer and musician
- Joseph Priestley (1983) Chemist and polymath
- Tito Puente (2011) Drummer
- Kazimierz Pułaski (1931) Revolutionary War soldier (spelled Casimir Pulaski on the stamp)
- Joseph Pulitzer (1947) Newspaper publisher
- Lewis B. "Chesty" Puller (2005) Marine Corps General
- Rufus Putnam (1937) Northwest Territory settler
- Ernest Taylor Pyle (1971) Journalist
- Howard Pyle (1964) Illustrator

== Q ==
- Harriet Quimby (1991) Pilot and aviation pioneer

== R ==
- Ma Rainey (1994) Blues singer
- Martín Ramírez (2015) Artist
- Ayn Rand (1999) Author
- Asa Philip Randolph (1989) Labor & Civil Rights advocate

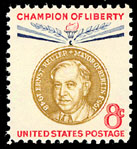
Ernst Reuter on a 1958 stamp

- Raphael (1973) Painter
- Marjorie Kinnan Rawlings (2008) Author
- Man Ray (2002, 2013) Photographer
- Sam Rayburn (1962) Legislator
- George Read (1976), lawyer and signer of the Declaration of Independence.
- Nancy Reagan (2022) First Lady
- Ronald Reagan (2005, 2011) 40th president
- Red Cloud (1987) Oglala Lakota leader
- Otis Redding (1993) Singer and songwriter
- Walter Reed (1940) Army surgeon

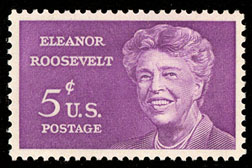
Eleanor Roosevelt on a 1963 stamp

- Frederic Remington (1940) Sculptor, painter
- James Renwick Jr. (1980) Architect
- Ernst Reuter (1959) Berlin Mayor

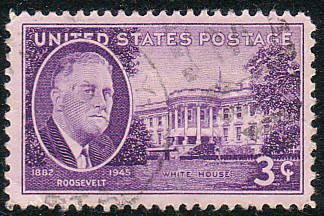
Franklin D. Roosevelt on a 1945 stamp

- Bernard Revel (1986) Rabbi and scholar
- Paul Revere (1958) Revolutionary War messenger
- Frederick Hurten Rhead (2011) Industrial designer
- Eddie Rickenbacker (1995) World War I aviator
- Sally Ride (2018) Astronaut
- James Whitcomb Riley (1940) Poet
- Knute Rockne (1988) Football coach
- Gilbert Rohde (2011) Industrial designer
- Paul Robeson (2004) Actor, singer, civil Rights advocate

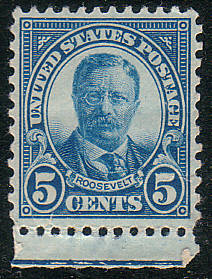
Theodore Roosevelt on a 1922 stamp

- Edward G. Robinson (2000) Actor
- Jackie Robinson (1982) Baseball player
- Sugar Ray Robinson (2006) Boxer
- Norman Rockwell (1972) Painter
- Jimmie Rodgers (1978) Country singer, musician, and songwriter
- Richard Rodgers (1999) Composer
- Theodore Roethke (2012) Poet
- Fred Rogers (2018) Television personality and producer
- Roy Rogers (2010) Singer, Actor
- Will Rogers (1948) Humorist
- Felipe Rojas-Lombardi (2014) Chef, cookbook author
- Eleanor Roosevelt (1963) First Lady
- Franklin Delano Roosevelt (1945) 32nd president
- Theodore Roosevelt (1922, 1938) 26th president
- Betsy Ross (1952) Upholsterer credited with designing the first U.S. flag
- Mark Rothko (1998) Painter
- Wilma Rudolph (1995) Olympic sprinter
- Jimmy Rushing (1994) Blues and jazz singer
- Charles M. Russell (1964) Artist
- Andrew J. Russell (1944) Photographer
- Richard Russell (1984) Governor and U.S. Senator from Georgia
- George Herman "Babe" Ruth (1983) Baseball player

== S ==
- Albert Sabin (2006) Virologist
- Augustus Saint-Gaudens (1940) Sculptor

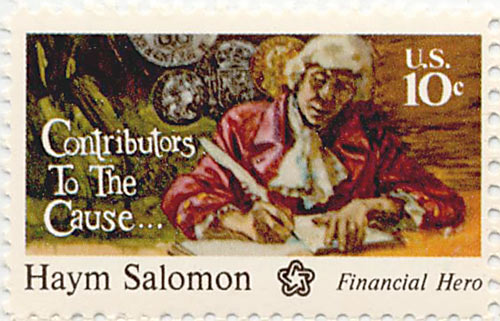
Haym Salomon on a 1975 stamp

- Rubén Salazar (2008) Journalist
- Jonas Salk (2006) Medical scientist
- Haym Salomon (1975) Revolutionary War financier
- William T. Sampson (1937) Navy Admiral
- José de San Martín (1959) South American liberator
- Carl Sandburg (1978) Writer
- William Saroyan (1991) Writer
- Sassoferrato (2009) painter
- Winfield Scott Schley (1937) Navy officer
- Arturo Alfonso Schomburg (2020) historian and writer
- Charles M. Schulz (2022) Cartoonist

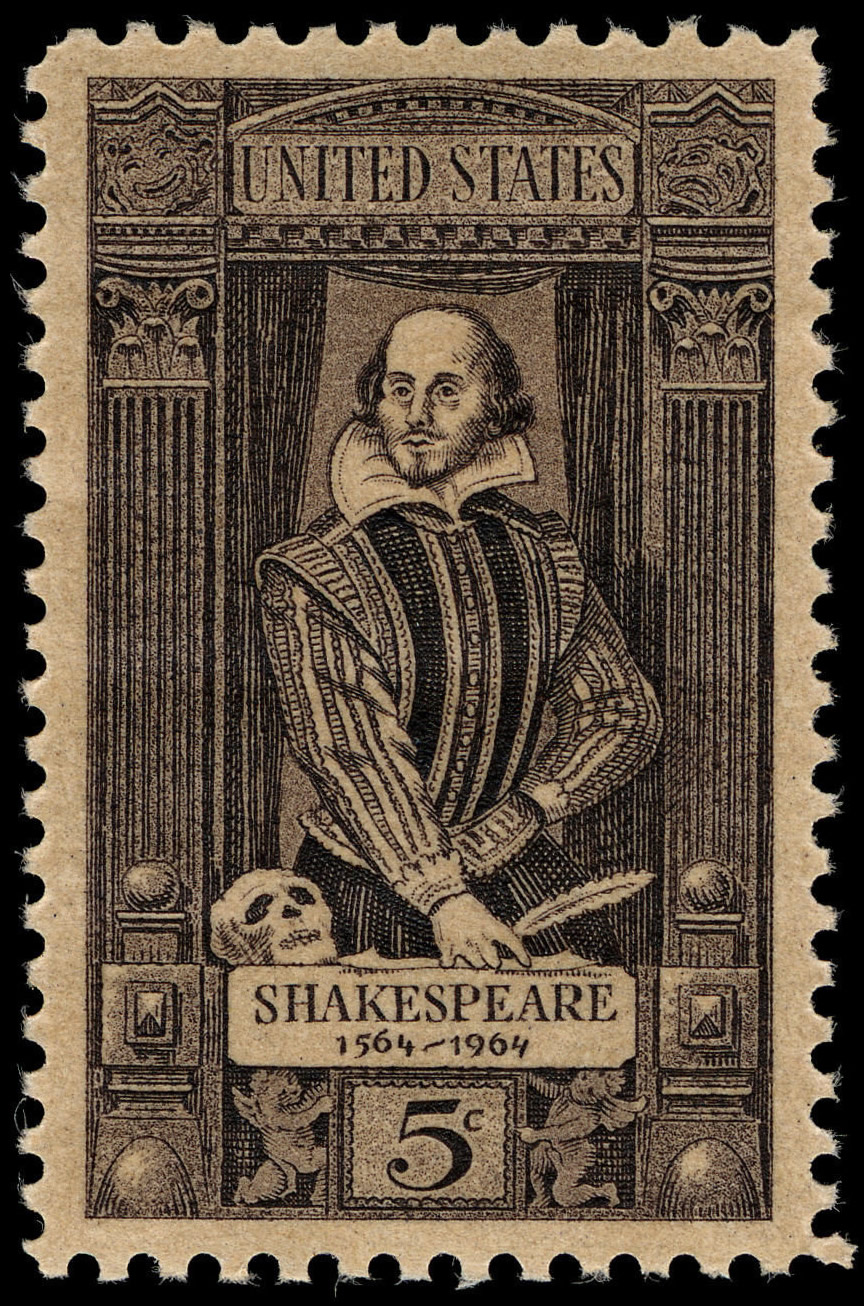
William Shakespeare on a 1938 stamp

- Carl Schurz (1983) Journalist
- Blanche Stuart Scott (1980) Aviator
- Winfield Scott (1870) Army general
- Pete Seeger (2022) Musician and social activist
- Selena (2011) Singer
- David O. Selznick (2003) Motion picture producer
- Raphael Semmes (1995) Confederate naval officer
- Sequoyah (1980) Creator of the Cherokee syllabary
- Rod Serling (2009) Writer
- Junipero Serra (1985) Missionary

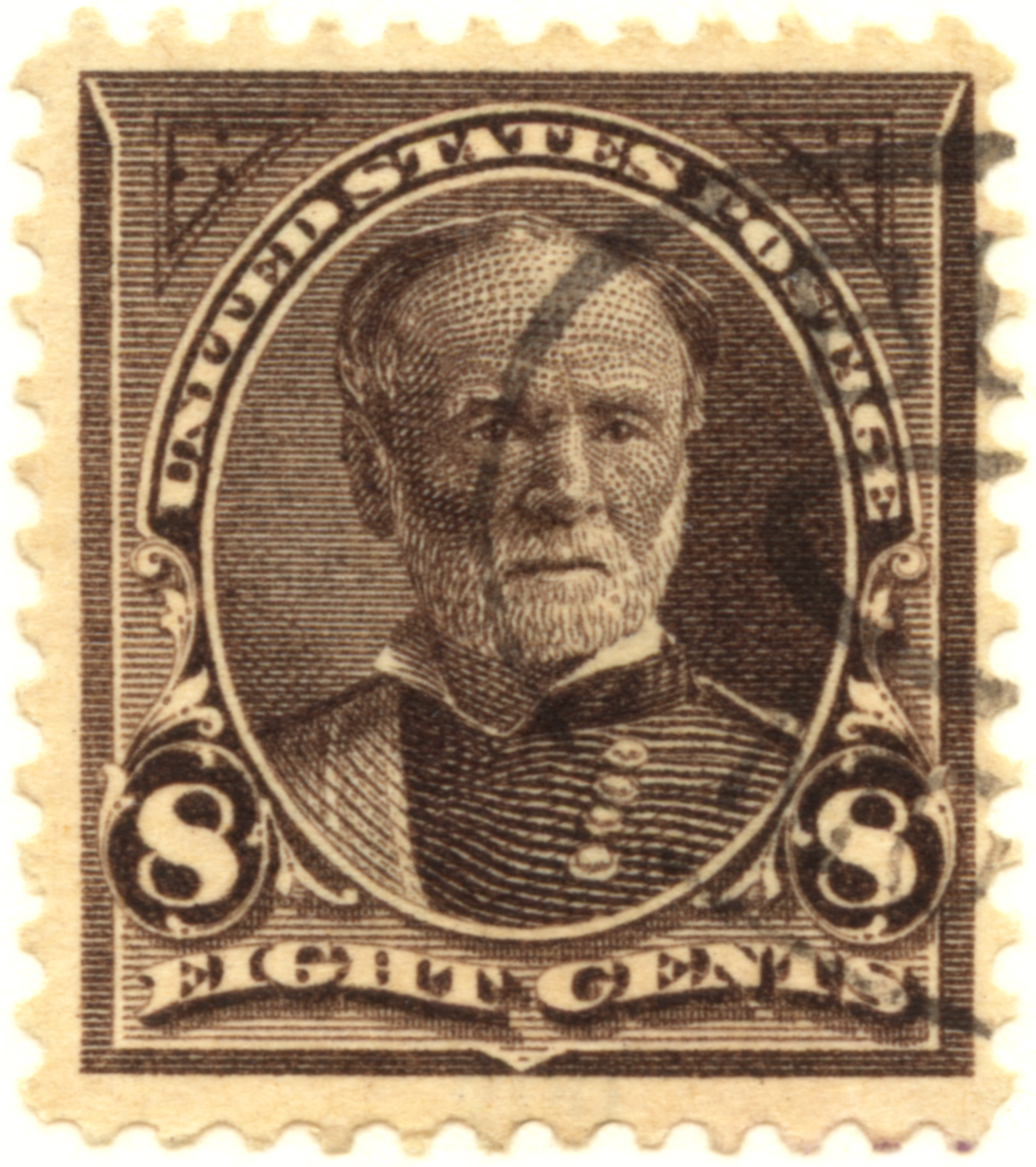
William Tecumseh Sherman on an 1893 stamp

- Eric Sevareid (2008) Journalist
- William Seward (1909) Secretary of State
- William Shakespeare (1964) Playwright
- Charles Sheeler (1998, 2013) Painter
- Alan Shepard (2011) Astronaut
- Philip Henry Sheridan (1937) Civil War General
- Roger Sherman (1976) Declaration of Independence signatory
- William Tecumseh Sherman (1893) Civil War General
- Dinah Shore (2009) Singer
- Igor Sikorsky (1988) Aircraft engineer
- Phil Silvers (2009) Comedian
- Shel Silverstein (2022) Poet, cartoonist and songwriter

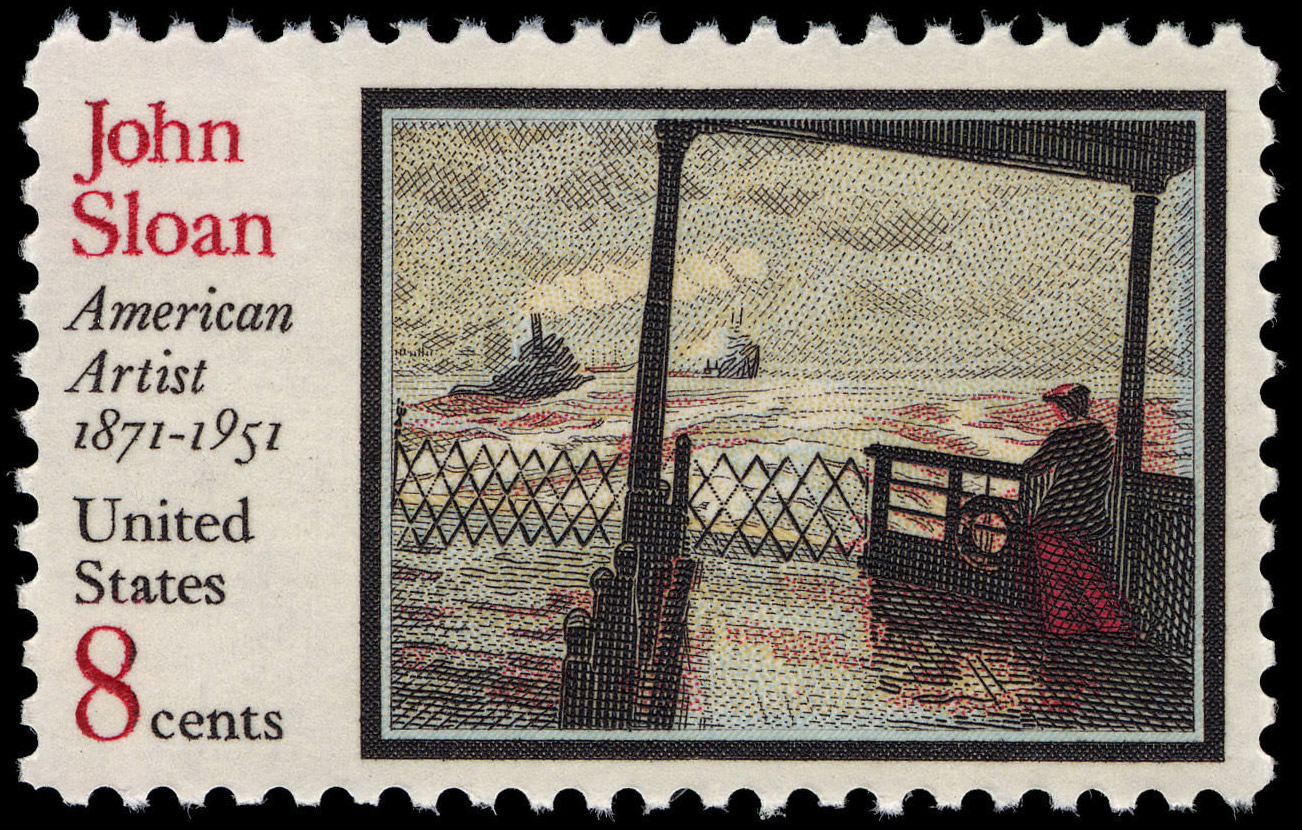
John Sloan on a 1971 stamp

- William S. Sims (2010) Admiral
- Frank Sinatra (2008) Singer/actor
- George Sisler (2000) Baseball player
- Sitting Bull (1989) Hunkpapa Sioux warrior
- Red Skelton (2009) Comedian
- John Sloan (1971) Painter
- Alfred E. Smith (1945) Governor and presidential candidate
- Bessie Smith (1994) Blues singer
- Jessie Willcox Smith (2001) Illustrator
- John Smith (1907) Virginia Colony leader

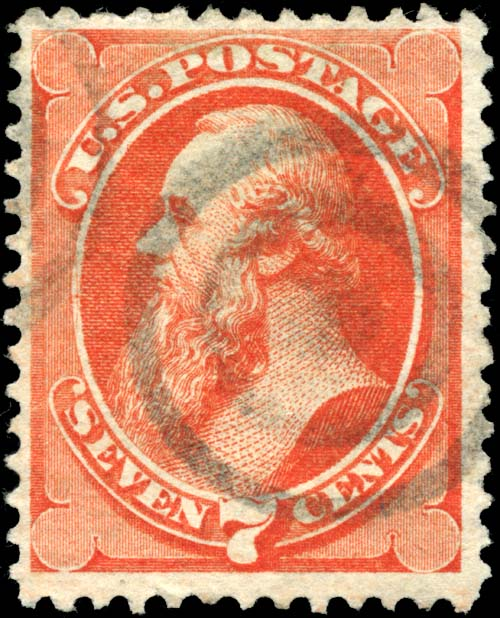
Edwin M. Stanton on an 1871 stamp

- Kate Smith (2010) Singer
- Margaret Chase Smith (2007) U.S. senator
- W. Eugene Smith (2002) Photographer
- John Philip Sousa (1940) Composer and conductor
- Albert Southworth (2002) Photographer
- Tris Speaker (2000) Baseball player
- Anne Spencer (2020) Poet
- Lawrence Sperry (1985) Aviation pioneer
- Joel Elias Spingarn (2009) Civil rights leader
- Chief Standing Bear (2023) Winner of Court Ruling
- Leland Stanford (1944) Railroad tycoon, politician, & philanthropist
- Edwin M. Stanton (1871) Secretary of War
- Elizabeth Cady Stanton (1948) Suffragist, feminist, and abolitionist

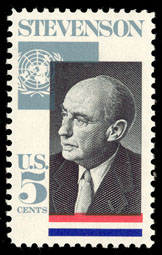
Adlai Stevenson on a 1965 stamp

- Willie Stargell (2012) Baseball player
- Vilhjalmur Stefansson (1986) Arctic explorer
- Edward Steichen (2002) Photographer
- John Steinbeck (1979) Author
- Max Steiner (1999) Composer
- Charles Steinmetz (1983) Inventor
- Joseph Stella (2013) Modern artist
- Friedrich Wilhelm von Steuben (1930) Revolutionary War general
- Wallace Stevens (2012) Poet
- Adlai Stevenson (1965) UN Ambassador and presidential candidate
- James Stewart (2007) Actor
- Alfred Stieglitz (2002) Photographer
- Clyfford Still (2010) Abstract expressionist artist
- William Still (2024) Underground Railroad Philadelphia network
- Joseph W. Stilwell (2000) Army General
- Richard Stockton (1976) Declaration of Independence signer

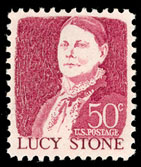
Lucy Stone on a 1968 stamp

- Leopold Stokowski (1997) Conductor
- Harlan Fiske Stone (1948) Chief Justice
- Lucy Stone (1965) Suffragist and feminist
- Joseph Story (2009) Supreme Court justice
- Harriet Beecher Stowe (2007) Author
- Paul Strand (2002) Photographer
- Igor Stravinsky (1982) Composer
- Gilbert Stuart (1940) Painter
- Harry Stuhldreher (1998) Notre Dame football player
- Anne Sullivan (1980) Teacher
- Ed Sullivan (2009) TV variety show host
- John Sullivan (1929) Army officer
- Pat Summitt (2027) College basketball coach, head coach of Tennessee Lady Vols

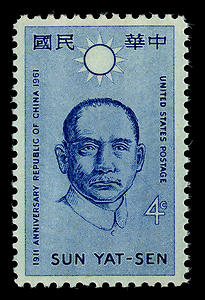
Sun Yat-sen on a 1961 stamp

- Sun Yat-sen (1942, 1961) Chinese revolutionary leader
- George Szell (1997) Conductor, composer

== T ==
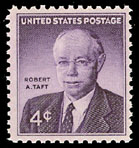
Robert A. Taft on a 1960 stamp

- Robert A. Taft (1960) Senator
- William Howard Taft (1930) 27th president, 10th Chief Justice of the United States
- William Talman (2009) Actor
- Henry Ossawa Tanner (1973) Painter

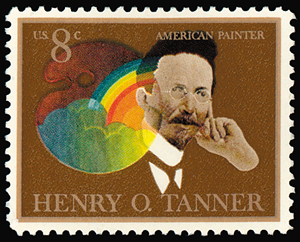
Henry Ossawa Tanner on a 1973 stamp

- Ida Tarbell (2002) Author, journalist
- Robert Robinson Taylor (2015) Architect and educator
- Zachary Taylor (1875) 12th president
- Walter Dorwin Teague (2011) Industrial designer
- Nikola Tesla (1983) Inventor
- Shirley Temple (2016) Actress and diplomat
- Mother Teresa (2010) Humanitarian
- Mary Church Terrell (2009) Civil rights leader
- Sonny Terry (1998) Harmonica player

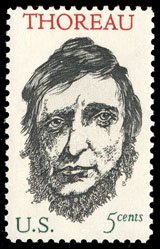
Henry David Thoreau on a 1967 stamp

- Sister Rosetta Tharpe (1998) Gospel and rock musician
- Sylvanus Thayer (1985) Superintendent of U.S. Military Academy
- Danny Thomas (2012) Entertainer
- Charles Thomson (1976) Continental Congress Secretary
- Henry David Thoreau (1967) Author
- Jim Thorpe (1984) Football player
- James Thurber (1994) Cartoonist and author
- Lawrence Tibbett (1997) Opera singer
- Giambattista Tiepolo (1982) Painter
- Lewis Comfort Tiffany (2007) Designer
- Bill Tilghman (1994) Lawman
- Dimitri Tiomkin (1999) Composer
- Arturo Toscanini (1989) Conductor
- Allen Toussaint (2025) Musician
- Pie Traynor (2000) Baseball player
- Alex Trebek (2024) Canadian-American game show host and television personality
- William B. T. Trego (1976) Painter
- Edward Trudeau (2008) "Phthisiologist"
- Harry S. Truman (1973) 33rd president
- Sojourner Truth (1986) Abolitionist
- Harriet Tubman (2024) Escaped slavery, Civil War scout and spy
- Richard Tucker (1997) Tenor
- Mark Twain (1940) Author
- John Tyler (1938) 10th President

== V ==
- Ritchie Valens (1993) Rock musician
- Rudolph Valentino (1994) Actor
- James Van Der Zee (2002) Photographer
- Martin Van Buren (1938) 8th President
- Vivian Vance (2009) Actress
- Félix Varela (1997) Social reformer
- Sarah Vaughan (2016) Jazz singer
- Alfred V. Verville (1985) Aviation pioneer
- King Vidor (2008) Film director, producer and screenwriter
- Oswald Garrison Villard (2009) Civil rights leader
- Greta von Nessen (2011) Industrial designer
- John von Neumann (2005) Mathematician

== W ==
- Honus Wagner (2000) Baseball player
- Madam C.J. Walker (1998) Philanthropist
- Mary Edwards Walker (1982) Civil War surgeon

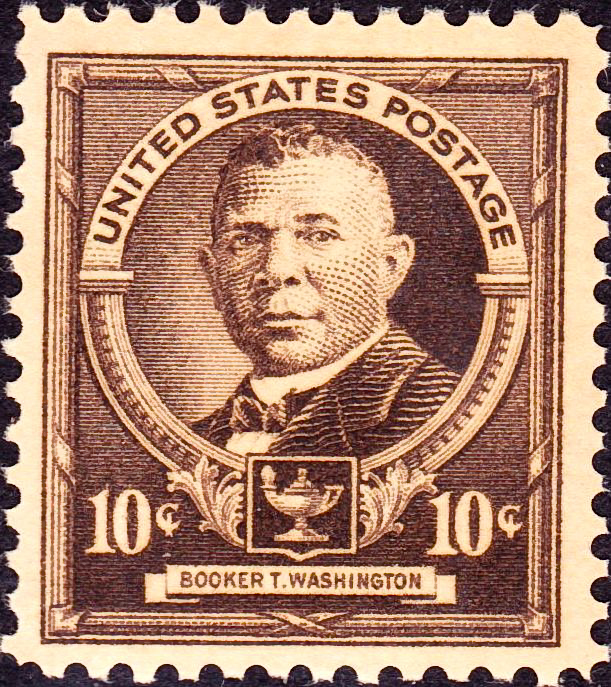
Booker T. Washington on a 1940 stamp

- DeWitt Wallace (1998) Publisher
- Lila Wallace (1998) Publisher
- Raoul Wallenberg (1997) Humanitarian
- Clara Ward (1998) Gospel singer
- Andy Warhol (2002) Painter

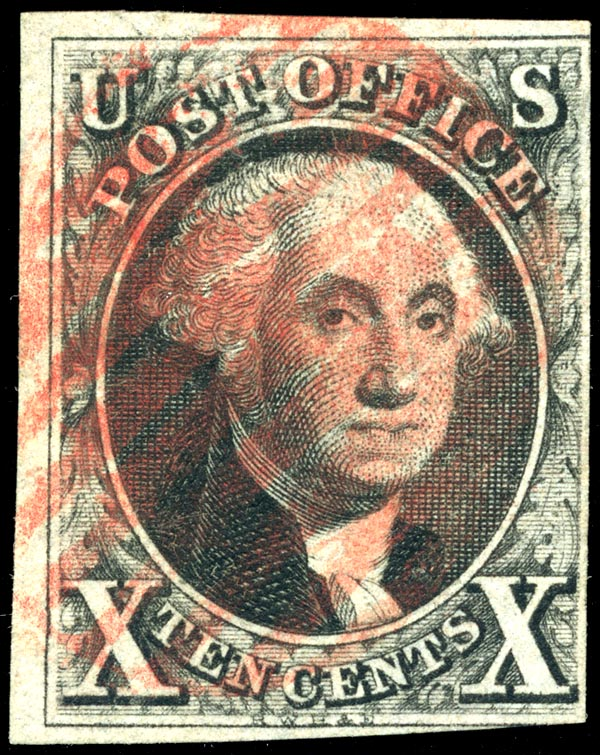
George Washington on an 1847 stamp

- "Pop" Warner (1997) Football coach
- Earl Warren (1992) Supreme Court Chief Justice
- Robert Penn Warren (2005) Author and poet

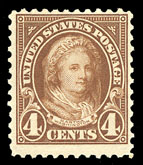
Martha Washington on a 1923 stamp

- Booker T. Washington (1940) Educator
- Dinah Washington (1993) Singer and songwriter
- Fredi Washington (2008) Actress

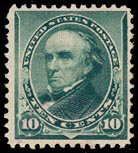
Daniel Webster on an 1890 stamp

- George Washington (1847) 1st president
- John P. Washington (1948) Chaplain (1st Lt.), U.S. Army
- Martha Washington (1902) First Lady
- Ethel Waters (1994) Singer and actress
- Muddy Waters (1994) Blues musician
- Stand Watie (1995) Cherokee politician and general
- Carleton Watkins (2002) Photographer
- Franz Waxman (1999) Film composer
- John Wayne (1990) Actor
- Jack Webb (2009) Actor
- Daniel Webster (1890) 14th and 19th U.S. Secretary of State

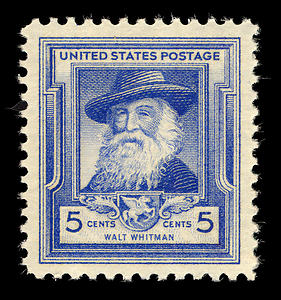
Walt Whitman on a 1940 stamp

- Noah Webster (1958) Lexicographer
- Orson Welles (1999) Actor/film director
- Ida B. Wells (1990) Journalist and civil rights activist
- Benjamin West (1975) Painter

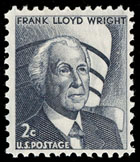
Frank Lloyd Wright, 1966

- Joseph West (1930) Charleston Governor
- Edward Weston (2002) Photographer
- Clifton R. Wharton Sr. (2006) Diplomat
- Edith Wharton (1980) Author
- Phillis Wheatley (2026) first African-American author of a published book of poetry
- Jon Whitcomb (2001) Illustrator
- Eli Whitney (1940) Inventor
- William Allen White (1948) Newspaper editor
- Betty White (2025) American actress and comedian
- Josh White (1998) Folk singer, musician, songwriter, and actor
- Minor White (2002) Photographer
- Paul Dudley White (1986) Cardiologist
- Walter Francis White (2009) Civil rights leader
- John Greenleaf Whittier (1940) Poet and abolitionist
- James McNeill Whistler (1940) Painter
- Walt Whitman (1940) Poet
- Elie Wiesel (2025) Humanitarian
- Hazel Wightman (1990) Olympic tennis player
- Billy Wilder (2012) Motion picture director
- Thornton Wilder (1997) Playwright
- Charles Wilkes (1988) Antarctic explorer
- Roy Wilkins (2001) Civil Rights advocate
- Frances E. Willard (1940) Educator
- Hank Williams (1993) Country singer, musician, and songwriter
- Roger Williams (1936) Rhode Island co-founder
- Ted Williams (2012) Baseball player
- Tennessee Williams (1995) Playwright
- William Williams (Continental Congress) (1976) Declaration of Independence signer
- William Carlos Williams (2012) Poet
- William Haliday Williams (1912) Rural mail carrier and Civil War Medal of Honor recipient
- Thomas Willing (1976) Continental Congressman
- Frances E. Willis (2006) Diplomat
- Wendell Willkie (1992) Statesman
- Bob Wills (1993) Country musician and songwriter
- Meredith Willson (1999) Composer, playwright
- August Wilson (2021) Playwright
- James Wilson (1976) Declaration of Independence signer
- Woodrow Wilson (1925, 1998) 28th president
- Garry Winogrand (2002) Photographer
- John Witherspoon (1976) Declaration of Independence signatory
- Oliver Wolcott (1976) Declaration of Independence signer
- Thomas Wolfe (2000) Author
- Grant Wood (1998) Painter
- John Wooden (2024) Basketball Coach
- Carter Woodson (1984) Historian
- Frank Lloyd Wright (1965) Architect
- Richard Wright (2009) Writer
- Russel Wright (2011) Industrial designer
- Chien-Shiung Wu (2021) Physicist who proved that the basic law of parity was violated in physics that paved the way for the Standard Model
- Andrew Wyeth (2017) Artist
- Newell Convers Wyeth (2001) Illustrator

== X ==
- Malcolm X (1999) Civil rights advocate

== Y ==
- Alvin C. York (2000) World War I soldier, Medal of Honor recipient
- Cy Young (2000) Baseball player
- Whitney Moore Young (1981) Civil Rights advocate

== Z ==
- Babe Zaharias (1981) Track & field athlete

== See also ==
- Presidents of the United States on U.S. postage stamps
- List of United States airmail stamps
- Artists of stamps of the United States
- Postage stamps and postal history of the United States
- Postage stamps and postal history of the Confederate States
