= Joyce Chen =

Joyce Chen or Chan may refer to:

- Joyce Chen (chef) (1917–1994), Chinese-American chef, author, and television personality
- Chen Liping (born 1965), Singaporean actress (陳莉萍)
