= George Salisbury (governor) =

George Robert Salisbury

15th Naval Governor of Guam
- In office January 21, 1911 – January 30, 1912
- Preceded by: Frank Freyer
- Succeeded by: Robert Coontz

Personal details
- Spouse: Adele Trowbridge Salisbury

Military service
- Allegiance: United States
- Branch/service: United States Navy
- Rank: Commodore
- Battles/wars: Spanish–American War; World War I

George Robert Salisbury was a United States Navy Commodore who served as the 15th Naval Governor of Guam. Though he originally served as an Engineering Duty Officer, he eventually stopped being a Restricted Line Officer, and retired from the Navy as a Commodore. As governor, he rolled back a number of educational reforms and encouraged a new ranch system. He also took drastic measures to control the leprosy epidemic on the island, removing the infected to Philippines. He was briefly called into service during World War I before retiring.

== Life and naval career ==
Salisbury was appointed to the United States Naval Academy from Missouri in 1874, graduating on June 10, 1879. He served as an Engineering Duty Officer from 1881 to 1892, during this time, he served as a naval engineer aboard the USS Chicago in 1889. He participated in the Spanish–American War aboard a battleship. On March 3, 1899, his ranked was changed to lieutenant. From 1899 to 1902, he served aboard the USS Massachusetts. He achieved the rank of lieutenant commander in 1902.

He attempted to retire, but was recalled up to service in the Reserve Naval Fleet during World War I. He was placed in charge of overseeing minesweeper production in Buffalo, New York. He ultimately retired with the title of Commodore.

== Governorship ==
Salisbury was Governor of Guam from January 21, 1911, to January 30, 1912. He rolled back some education reforms of Governor Edward John Dorn, and once again allowed residents who lived more than two hours from a public school to forgo attendance if they desired. He also changed the age of compulsory schooling to those between the ages of six and twelve. Salisbury soon found himself, like the governors before him, unable to control the spread of leprosy through Guam. Taking drastic measures, he began removing the infected from the island, quarantining them in the Philippines. He encouraged the native Chamorro population to increasingly live on ranches, raise livestock, and farm.

== Personal life ==
On January 10, 1889, Salisbury married Adele Trowbridge in Brooklyn, New York. They had one son, Samuel. On December 6, 1913, Salisbury divorced Adele Trowbridge in an uncontested court decision with no alimony.

On October 6, 1950, Salisbury died in Philadelphia, Pennsylvania.
