= Frank Freyer =

US Navy officer (1878-1947)

Frank Barrows Freyer

14th Naval Governor of Guam
- In office November 5, 1910 – January 21, 1911
- Preceded by: Edward John Dorn
- Succeeded by: George Salisbury

Personal details
- Born: December 10, 1878 Marietta, Georgia, United States
- Died: December 7, 1947 (aged 68)
- Education: United States Naval Academy; George Washington University
- Awards: Order of the Sun

Military service
- Allegiance: United States
- Branch/service: United States Navy
- Rank: Captain
- Commands: Peruvian Navy; USS Procyon; USS Trenton

Frank Barrows Freyer (December 10, 1878 – December 7, 1947) was a United States Navy captain who served as the 14th Naval Governor of Guam. Freyer graduated from the United States Naval Academy in 1902, having played several collegiate sports there. The Navy assigned him to many different ships, including having him participate in the Great White Fleet and its visit to Japan. Soon after, he was transferred to the Naval Base Guam, where he served as assistant to the Commandant before from November 5, 1910, to January 21, 1911, he became acting governor of the island. As governor, he suspended the licenses of all midwives on the island because of an alarming rate of infection, requiring them all to be re-certified. After George Salisbury relieved him of the position, Freyer became his aide.

In 1913, he received a Bachelor of Laws from George Washington University and, in 1918, became assistant to the Judge Advocate General of the Navy. After agreeing to help Peru restructure its naval forces, the United States Navy ordered Freyer there to take command of the efforts; he became Chief of Staff of the Peruvian Navy the following year. In the position, he helped rebuild the naval tactics and education of the country, and stayed there for many years. During his stay, Freyer collected over 1,000 works of Peruvian art, now on display as the "Frank Barrow Freyer Collection" at the Denver Art Museum. He went on to command USS Procyon and USS Trenton before retiring.

== Life ==
Freyer was originally from Marietta, Georgia. He began his college career at Georgia Institute of Technology in the fall of 1895. While there he founded the Georgia Tech chapter of Kappa Sigma. In the fall of 1898 he transferred to the United States Naval Academy. He graduated from the United States Naval Academy in 1902 and received a Bachelor of Laws from George Washington University in 1913. He married and two children, a daughter Engracia and a son Frank Barrow Freyer II. His granddaughter, G. Diane Freyer, married William Schneider, Jr., an Under-Secretary of State in the Reagan administration. After retiring from the Navy, Freyer and his wife lived in Denver, Colorado. He and his wife were avid art collectors, amassing a painting and furniture collection of over 1,000 works of Peruvian artwork. The "Frank Barrow Freyer Collection" has been displayed in numerous museums, including the Newark Museum, the Brooklyn Museum, the Columbus Museum of Fine Arts, and the Toledo Museum of Art. Many of the collection's pieces currently reside in the Denver Art Museum, and a piece from the collection, Ignacio Chacon's Madonna and Child with Bird, was depicted on a United States postage stamp in 2006.

== Naval career ==
Freyer was admitted to the United States Naval Academy in May 1898 from Georgia. While attending the academy, he participated as a member of the Navy Midshipmen crew team and as a fullback for the Navy Midshipmen football team. He was also a member of Kappa Sigma fraternity. Soon after graduating, Freyer served as an ensign aboard USS Olympia in 1903. Freyer later served aboard USS Missouri during its visit to Japan as part of the Great White Fleet. In 1917, Freyer was stationed aboard USS Oregon. In 1918, he was transferred to Washington, D.C., where he became assistant to the Judge Advocate General of the Navy.

Freyer, now a commander, sailed for Peru in August 1920 as head of a mission aiding in the reorganization of the Peruvian Navy. He was soon named Chief of Staff of the Peruvian Navy in January 1921, using the position to rebuild Peruvian naval education and command. For his service to Peru, the Congress of the Republic of Peru awarded him the nation's highest award, the Order of the Sun. After leaving Peru, he captained USS Procyon. In 1929, Captain Freyer commanded USS Trenton.

== Governorship ==
Freyer served as acting Naval Governor of Guam from November 5, 1910, to January 21, 1911. Prior to becoming governor, he briefly served in the position of principal technical assistant to the Commandant of the Naval Base Guam from March 1 to March 8, 1909. As governor, Freyer addressed the alarming spread of infection and tetanus by suspending the licenses of all pattera, or midwives, and requiring that they all pass an additional recertification exam. After leaving the governorship, Lieutenant Freyer became aide to Governor George Salisbury.

== Personal life ==
On June 22, 1908, at the Fairmont Hotel in San Francisco, California, Freyer married Maria Engracia Critcher. They had three children, Engracia, Frank, and John.

In 1910, Freyer's daughter Engracia Enriquetta Critcher Freyer (1910-1977) was born in Hagåtña, Guam.
