= Maria Engracia Freyer =

American First Lady of Guam (1888–1969)

First Lady of Guam
- In role November 5, 1910 – January 21, 1911
- Governor: Frank Freyer

Personal details
- Born: Maria Engracia Critcher; April 2, 1888 San Francisco, California
- Died: 1969 (aged 80–81) Denver, Colorado
- Spouse: Frank Freyer
- Children: 3
- Occupation: First Lady of Guam, Art collector
- Other names: Maria Engracia Critcher Freyer, Maria E. Freyer, Maria Freyer, Madam, Engracia, Mrs. Frank Barrows Freyer, Mrs. Frank B. Freyer

Maria Engracia Freyer was an American First Lady of Guam and an art collector.

== Early life ==
On April 2, 1888, Freyer was born as Maria Engracia Critcher in San Francisco, California. Freyer's father was John Critcher. Freyer's mother was Henriquetta Brent (née Callagha) Critcher.

== Career ==
In 1910, when Frank Freyer was appointed the Naval Governor of Guam, Freyer became the First Lady of Guam on November 5, 1910, until January 21, 1911.

In 1920s, Freyer became involved in human and animal rights in Peru. Freyer became an art collector. Freyer owned "Madonna and Child with Bird", by artist Ignacio Chacón of Cuzco, Peru.

In 1927, Freyer presented a talk on Peruvian women at the Woman's Universal Alliance Conference in Washington, D.C.

In October 1939, Colonial Peruvian art pieces of Freyer's art collection were exhibited at the Pan American Union.

== Awards ==
- The Order of the Sun. Presented by Peru.

== Personal life ==
On June 22, 1908, at the Fairmont Hotel in San Francisco, California, Freyer married Frank Freyer, who later became a Naval officer and Governor of Guam. They had three children, Engracia, Frank, and John.

In 1910, Freyer's daughter Engracia Enriquetta Critcher Freyer (1910–1977) was born in Hagåtña, Guam.

In October 1969, Freyer died in Denver, Colorado.
