= Edward John Dorn =

13th Naval Governor of Guam
- In office December 28, 1907 – November 5, 1910
- Preceded by: Luke McNamee
- Succeeded by: Frank Freyer

Personal details
- Born: January 12, 1854 Potosi, Wisconsin, US
- Died: December 10, 1937 (aged 83) Washington, D.C., US

Edward J. Dorn (January 12, 1854 – December 10, 1937) was a captain in the United States Navy.

== Early life ==
On January 12, 1854, Dorn was born in Potosi, Wisconsin.

== Education ==
In June 1874, Dorn graduated from the United States Naval Academy.

== Career ==
In June 1887, Dorn was promoted to a Lieutenant.

Dorn was court-martialed in 1895 for an incident involving the death of a gunner on USS Olympia. In 1901, Dorn was briefly acting-Commandant (and therefore acting-Governor) of American Samoa while Commandant Benjamin Franklin Tilley was away on leave.

On 20 April 1904, Captain Edward John Dorn took command of USS Castine.

Based in part on this experience, he was appointed as the Governor of Guam on December 28, 1907, and remained there until November 5, 1910.

During World War I, he was the head of the Navy Relief Society.

== Personal life ==
In 1880, Dorn married Syble Helpine.

On December 10, 1937, Dorn died in Washington, D.C.
