= Joyce Chen (chef) =

Chinese-American chef (1917–1994)

- Born: Liao Chia-ai; September 14, 1917; Beijing, China
- Died: August 23, 1994 (aged 76); Lexington, Massachusetts, US
- Culinary career
- Cooking style: Northern-style Chinese cuisine
- Previous restaurant: Joyce Chen Restaurant
- Television show: Joyce Chen Cooks
Joyce Chen
- Chinese: 廖家艾
Transcriptions
Standard Mandarin
- Hanyu Pinyin: Liào Jiā'ài
- Wade–Giles: Liao Chia-ai

Joyce Chen, née Liao, Chinese name Liao Jia-ai (Chinese: 廖家艾; September 14, 1917 – August 23, 1994) was a Chinese-American chef, restaurateur, author, television personality, and entrepreneur.

Chen was credited with popularizing northern-style Chinese cuisine in the United States, coining the name "Peking Ravioli" for potstickers, inventing and holding a design patent for a flat bottom wok with handle, and developing the first line of bottled Chinese stir fry sauces for the U.S. market.

Starting in 1958, she operated several popular Chinese restaurants in Cambridge, Massachusetts. Chen was diagnosed with dementia in 1985, and died in 1994. Her accomplishments and influence on American cuisine were honored by the US Postal Service and by the city of Cambridge.

== Early life ==
Joyce Chen was born in Beijing, the youngest of nine children of a high-ranking Qing dynasty official, during the Republican era under Sun Yat-sen. Her wealthy father, a railroad administrator and city executive, could afford to hire a family cook. In her book, Joyce Chen Cook Book, she said that she grew up with a family chef who left to cook for her father's friend, "Uncle Li", who became the Chinese ambassador to Russia. At that point, her mother and her governess cooked the family meals, and Joyce watched and learned from them.

Chen and husband Thomas (m. 1943; div. 1966) with their children Henry (1944–2007) and Helen (b. 1948) left Shanghai (and China for the last time) on April 6, 1949, as the Communists were taking over the country. The family was on the second-to-last boat to leave Shanghai before the port closed. On April 21, Chen and her family settled in Cambridge, Massachusetts.

Thomas Chen worked as an importer of fine art, while Joyce was a housewife raising two children, a dramatic change from her job in China as an insurance broker (an uncommon vocation for women in China at that time). She gave birth to another son, Stephen, in 1952. In 1957, she first thought that her cooking might be popular when she made pumpkin cookies and Chinese egg rolls for a bake sale fundraiser at the Buckingham School in Cambridge. She was surprised to hear that her then-unfamiliar Chinese snacks had sold out within an hour, and she was encouraged to make more. Chen had already become adept at finding or substituting hard-to-get ingredients, and adapting her recipes to American tastes.

== Restaurants ==
Chen opened her first restaurant, Joyce Chen Restaurant, at 617 Concord Avenue in Cambridge in 1958. According to her son, Stephen, here she pioneered the all-you-can-eat Chinese dinner buffet to boost sales on otherwise-slow Tuesday and Wednesday nights. She also used the buffet format to allow customers to sample unfamiliar authentic dishes at their own pace. She promoted healthy Chinese cooking and refused to use Red Dye No. 2 and other food coloring at her restaurants. For Chinese-speaking and English-speaking staff and customers to communicate more easily, Chen introduced the practice of numbering menu items.

Chen introduced northern Chinese (Mandarin) and Shanghainese dishes to Boston, including Peking duck, moo shu pork, hot and sour soup, and potstickers, which she called "Peking Ravioli", sometimes shortened to "Ravs". The first restaurant operated for thirteen years, closing in 1971. In 1969, members of Bolt, Beranek and Newman's IMP team ate at Chen's restaurant, which was located next door to BBN, when they were working on the first IMPs to create the ARPANET.

After her divorce in 1966, Chen sold the original restaurant to her ex-husband, who converted it in 1972 to a Japanese eatery called Osaka. With her divorce from Thomas Chen, she legally reverted to using her maiden name, Joyce Liao, but continued use the Joyce Chen moniker for her business. Now a single mother with three children, she managed to open a second restaurant in 1967, called The Joyce Chen Small Eating Place. It was located between Harvard University and MIT in Central Square, Cambridge, at 302 Massachusetts Avenue. Chen's son, Stephen, later noted that the opening of this restaurant changed the landscape of the Central Square area in Cambridge. Originally, it was a retail and industrial area, dominated by a Necco factory. People lined up to get Chen's Chinese food at this small restaurant, which seated 60 people. According to Stephen Chen, it was at this restaurant that his mother introduced the Northern style of dim sum, and the now popular "soup dumplings" (shao long bao). The restaurant was very popular with computer hackers. It operated for 21 years and closed in 1988.

In 1969, Chen opened her third restaurant, a much larger space seating 500 people, in an existing building located at 500 Memorial Drive in Cambridge. This restaurant, also called Joyce Chen Restaurant, benefited from its proximity to MIT and Harvard. However, the restaurant closed in 1974 when the building was demolished so that the MIT dorms New House, and later, Next House, could be built on the site. New House was jokingly known by MIT students as the "Joyce Chen Small Living Place" for a time.

In 1973, Chen opened her fourth restaurant in an elegant Modernist custom-designed building at 390 Rindge Avenue, near Fresh Pond. The building, designed by Alan Ahakian, was described as "marvelously secluded behind a baffled garden wall that focuses around a single tree". The restaurant, also called Joyce Chen Restaurant, seated 263. It operated for 25 years and closed in 1998.

In 1975, Chen's eldest son, Henry, opened a fifth Joyce Chen Restaurant on Cape Cod, but it closed after a year and a half. Her other son, Stephen, managed a downtown branch of Joyce Chen Restaurant, which operated from 1988 until 1994.

Chen was a warm hostess who formed relationships with many guests, including John Kenneth Galbraith, James Beard, Julia Child, Henry Kissinger, Beverly Sills, and Danny Kaye. Nathan Pusey, a former Harvard president, called her eating establishment "not merely a restaurant, but a cultural exchange center". She would often mingle with guests, including those with no celebrity.

== Career highlights ==
Following the 1958 opening of her first restaurant, Chen began teaching Chinese cooking at the Cambridge Center for Adult Education and the Boston Center for Adult Education in 1960. There were long waiting lists for her classes. At this time, she introduced many Americans to home style and gourmet Chinese cooking techniques.

In 1962, Chen published her influential cookbook, the Joyce Chen Cook Book. Publishers had balked at her insistence on color pictures of food, so she had the book published privately at her own expense. She pre-sold over 6,000 copies of her book at her restaurants before the book was printed. Eventually a publisher became interested, and sold an additional 70,000 copies, and still more in later reprintings over the years. Boston cardiologist Paul Dudley White wrote the foreword to her book, and praised her use of healthier ingredients. MSG was popular at the time, and was included in most of the recipes.

In 1967, Chen starred in her own cooking show called Joyce Chen Cooks, on National Educational Television (NET), now the Public Broadcasting Service (PBS). Twenty-six episodes were filmed on the same set as The French Chef (featuring Julia Child) in the studios of WGBH in Boston. The two programs were both produced by Ruth Lockwood, and the basic studio kitchen setup was superficially redecorated in an "oriental" motif.

Julia Child had already been a regular visitor at Chen's restaurant, and a fan of her cooking.

Chen's cooking show aired widely across the US, and eventually in the United Kingdom and Australia; eleven of these original programs can still be seen on the WGBH website. Chen was not a rigid purist, sometimes discussing what kinds of readily-available American ingredients could be substituted for hard-to-find Chinese ingredients. She would later be criticized for adapting and simplifying recipes for American tastes, although she pioneered in an era when few viewers had access to authentic Chinese ingredients and flavors. Her recipes were many American viewers' first glimpse at the making of Chinese food, beyond such Americanized dishes as chop suey and chow mein. She also introduced some novel kitchen tools to American audiences, including the wok and the Chinese chef's knife, often misidentified as a "Chinese cleaver".

Chen lacked the informal, casual English-language fluency of Julia Child, and spent hours with voice coaches carefully trying to improve her pronunciation. Her programs gained a modest following among viewers, and Reader’s Digest gave her an award for educational television. However, the pilot season failed to gain a funding sponsor, and was discontinued after its initial run of 26 episodes. Later critics pointed out that she was one of the few non-white television cooking show hosts to have any American national distribution before the 1980s. After the end of the season, the show was re-run intermittently until 1976.

In 1971, Chen launched Joyce Chen Products, a line of higher quality Chinese cooking utensils. At that time she helped popularize Chinese cookware, and held the design patent (US#221397S) to a flat bottom wok with a handle, also known as a stir fry pan, which she called a "Peking Wok". She also introduced polyethylene cutting boards, made in Japan by Sumitomo Bakelite. In 1982, Joyce Chen Specialty Foods would be formed to sell bottled sauces and other flavorings.

== Final years and legacy ==
In 1968, Chen took her then-16-year-old son Stephen, and 20-year-old daughter Helen on a trip around the world on Pan Am Flight 001. Joyce, Stephen, and Helen also traveled to China in 1972, the same year that President Nixon first visited China. By this time, Stephen was an undergraduate at Boston University, and took a one-day crash course in cinematography at WGBH. He would return from the family trip with plenty of footage, which was used in the majority of a documentary, co-produced with Ruth Lockwood, which was aired nationally on PBS as Joyce Chen's China in May 1973. A few months later, the Chen family were the victims of a home invasion by five intruders who had seen the film, according to her son Stephen.

Chen suffered a serious injury to her right hand in 1976, when she dropped a large glass jar that contained her stir fry sauce. She underwent four to five hours of microsurgery, but never fully recovered the use of her right hand.

In the years following her hand injury, according to her son Stephen, Chen would forget certain phone numbers for food vendors she had been relying on to run her restaurants, and by 1983 she had stopped relying on food vendors entirely. She often blamed her hand injury for her forgetfulness.

From that point on, Chen's memory gradually worsened until she was officially diagnosed in 1985 with multi-infarct dementia, although some accounts of her life state she had been diagnosed with Alzheimer's disease. However, at that time such a conclusion could only be confirmed by an autopsy after death. Stephen cared for Chen at home until 1992, when she was moved into the Fairlawn Nursing Home in Lexington, Massachusetts, where she died from cardiac arrest on August 23, 1994, aged 76. She was buried in Mount Auburn Cemetery in Cambridge, Massachusetts.

Posthumously in 1998, Chen's contributions to cuisine were described in Beard House, The Magazine of the James Beard Foundation. In September 2012, the city of Cambridge held their first "Festival of Dumplings" in Central Square to honor what would have been Chen's 95th birthday. There have since been dumpling festivals in 2013 and 2014. The New York Historical Society exhibit, Chinese American: Exclusion/Inclusion (September 26, 2014 - April 19, 2015) reviewed the history of the Chinese in America, featuring Chen's contributions.

Celebrity chef Ming Tsai later said of Chen, "She is the Chinese Julia Child [...] Joyce Chen helped elevate what Chinese food was about. She didn't dumb it down. She opened people's eyes to what good Chinese could taste like."

On September 26, 2014, the US Postal Service issued 20 million copies of the "Celebrity Chefs Forever" stamp series, which featured portraits by Jason Seiler of five American chefs: Chen, Julia Child, James Beard, Edna Lewis, and Felipe Rojas-Lombardi. According to the Postal Service, "Joyce Chen is one of America's most well-known promoters of Chinese food. From her landmark restaurant in the Boston area to her cookbooks and trailblazing PBS television show, Chen invited newcomers to sample unfamiliar dishes in ways that firmly established Chinese cuisine in the United States."

On September 5, 2017, nine days before what would have been Chen's 100th birthday, an illustrated children's book about her life, Dumpling Dreams: How Joyce Chen Brought the Dumpling from Beijing to Cambridge, written by Carrie Clickard and illustrated by Katy Wu, was published.

== Business legacy ==
Chen was diagnosed with dementia in 1985, and immediately retired. She was succeeded by daughter Helen Chen, herself a chef and cookbook author, as chief executive officer of the company, Joyce Chen Inc. Youngest son Stephen became in charge of running the restaurant operations, while Helen concentrated on managing the specialty foods and cookware businesses.

Following their mother's death in 1994, Stephen continued to run the restaurant business. However, in 1998 the restaurant at 390 Rindge Avenue closed, thus ending the 40-year run of the Joyce Chen Restaurant chain altogether. The building and site were purchased by Just-A-Start, and underwent a one-year renovation. In 1999, the former restaurant was re-opened, this time as a childcare facility, while the remainder of the lot on Rindge Avenue was filled with residential housing. In 2005, the structure was demolished in order to make more room for additional residential units.

After the restaurant business ceased operations, Helen continued to run Joyce Chen Products, but in January 2003 she sold the business to Columbian Home Products in order to provide the company with additional capital. Helen has since written and published three cookbooks of her own, and in 2007 she developed her own line of cookware for Harold Import Company (Lakewood, New Jersey), under a new banner "Helen's Asian Kitchen". Helen has also taught cooking at Boston University.

In January 2020, Columbian Home Products, the distributor of the "Joyce Chen", "Keilen" and "Origins" cookware brands since 2003, closed its plant in Terre Haute, Indiana and laid off its remaining 82 employees. Prior to the closure, Columbian had sold the three brands to Honey-Can-Do, and the "Granite-Ware" brand to Cinsa USA. "Snow River Products", another former brand of Columbian Home Products, was spun off as a stand-alone company, and transitioned to a custom wood products business and away from selling to retailers.

As of 2021, Stephen is president of Joyce Chen Foods, Inc., which sells food products inspired by his mother's recipes, including Asian sauces, oils, condiments, and spices. Over time, the line has been expanded to include gluten-free, certified kosher, and lower-sodium foods, none of which have added MSG content. In 2006, after countless requests from former restaurant customers, the line was also expanded to include frozen potstickers.

Eldest son Henry and his wife Barbara (née Castagnoli) owned and managed Joyce Chen Unlimited, a retail store in Acton, Massachusetts, which closed in March 2008, five months after his death.

Several Chen disciples have gone on to establish restaurants of their own in the Boston area that serve Chinese cuisine. Among them is Pui Chan at "The Wok" in Wellesley, Massachusetts. Chan worked for Chen at the Rindge Avenue location starting in 1973 and, with her encouragement, opened his own restaurant in 1978.

In March 2023, the Joyce Chen brand was acquired by kitchen scale manufacture Escali.
