= Ignacio Chacon =

Peruvian painter

Ignacio Chacon (1745–1775) was a Peruvian painter from Cusco. He painted with floral borders, bright colors and gold-leaf overlay which were part of the mestizo-baroque style that came out of Cusco, capital of the Inca Empire. His paintings incorporated Christian traditions with Peruvian influences. For Christmas 2006, the United States Postal Service issued a stamp of his Madonna and Child painting called “Madonna and Child with Bird” from the collection of the Denver Art Museum. The oil-on-canvas painting is from 1765 and has been on display since 1972.
