= Felipe Rojas-Lombardi =

Peruvian-American chef (??–1991)

Felipe Rojas-Lombardi (died September 10, 1991) was a Peruvian-American chef whose Spanish and Caribbean influences have impacted America's haute cuisine.

An assistant to James Beard's Greenwich Village cooking school, he was the founding chef of Dean & Deluca gourmet food store. He opened the Ballroom in New York City and then Café Ba-Ba-Reeba! In Chicago. In 1976, he was named America's Bicentennial chef.

He was featured on a PBS series on “New York’s Master Chefs” and is credited with bringing the concept of tapas to America. He authored Soup, Beautiful Soup and South American Kitchen.

== Death ==
Rojas-Lombardi died of heart failure in New York City on September 10, 1991. In 2014, the United States Postal Service honored him with a Celebrity Chefs stamp.
