= List of colleges and universities in Oregon =

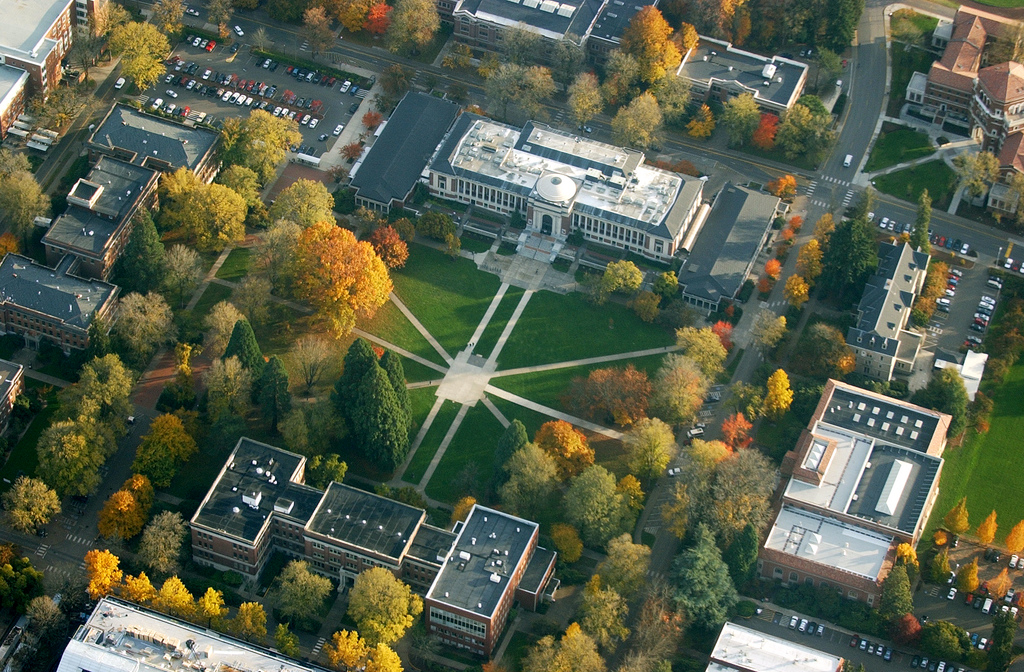
Oregon State University in Corvallis, OSU is the state's largest university.

This is a list of colleges and universities in the U.S. state of Oregon. Seven public universities are operated by boards and seventeen community colleges are operated by locally elected boards. There are also numerous private degree-granting institutions.

The largest university in the state is Oregon State University (OSU), with an enrollment of just over 36,000 (2023). OSU has branch campuses in Portland, Bend and Newport. The largest institution of higher education in the state is Portland Community College, based in Southwest Portland. The college serves the state's largest metropolitan population, with branch campuses throughout Portland, and claims an enrollment of over 67,000 students (2023).

The oldest college in the state is Willamette University, which was established 1842, and is also the oldest university in the Western United States. OSU was the first to offer public higher education in the state. OSU opened its doors in 1856 as a community preparatory school for the Oregon Territory and was officially chartered by the state in 1868. OSU briefly served as a private school for eight years, starting in 1860. The University of Oregon was next to follow, opening in 1876. Western Oregon University (WOU), which started as a private school in 1856, was converted to a public institution in 1882. WOU is recognized as the oldest currently public college in the state, while OSU holds the distinction of being the state's first public college and has served the longest in this capacity. Central Oregon Community College (COCC) was founded in 1949 as part of the Bend School District and is the longest-standing community college in the state. The COCC College District was formed in 1959 and was officially established as the Central Oregon Area Education District by a vote of residents in 1962.

This list includes all schools that grant degrees at an associate level or higher, and are either accredited or in the process of accreditation by a recognized accrediting agency.

== Institutions ==
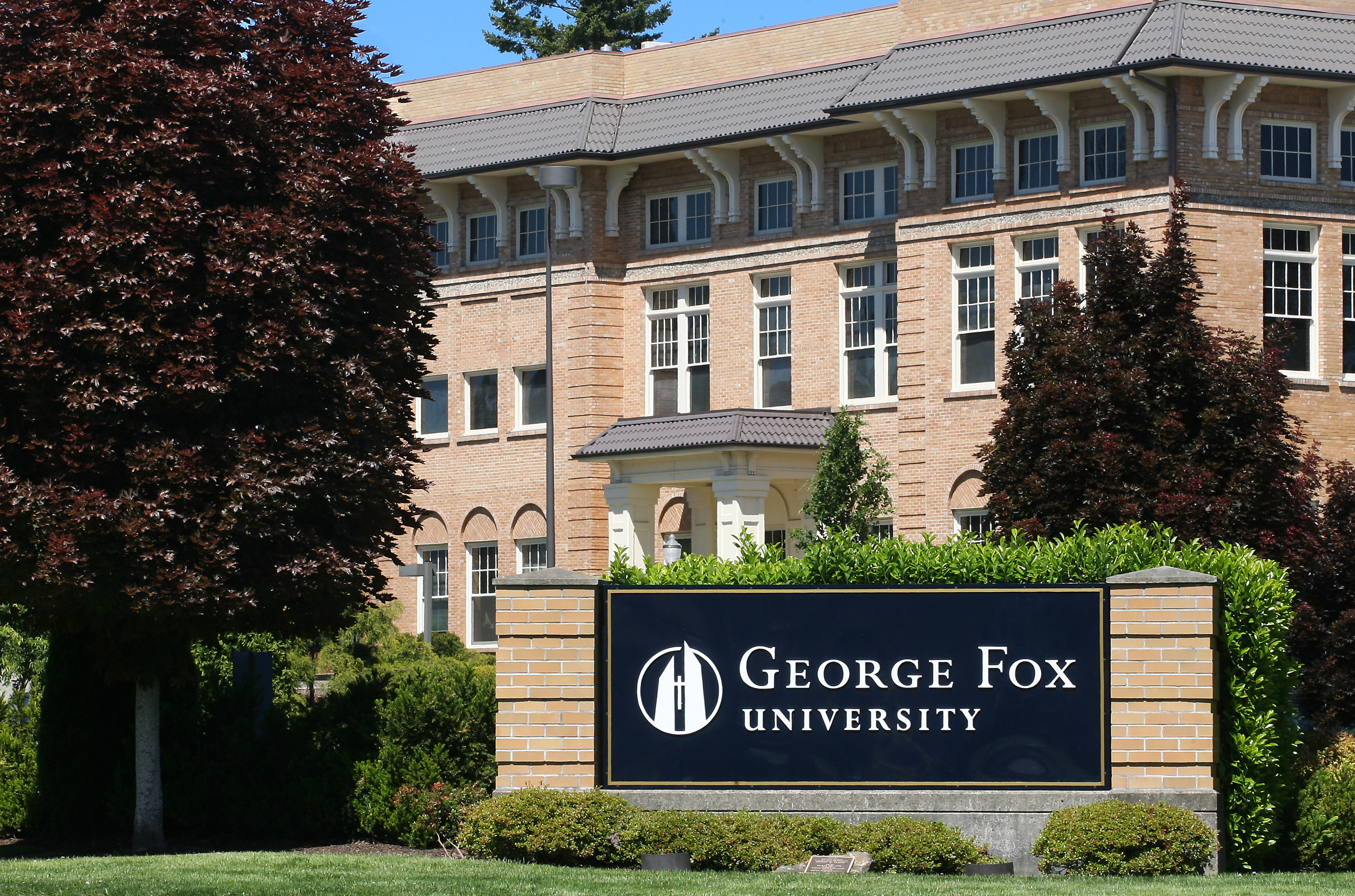
George Fox University

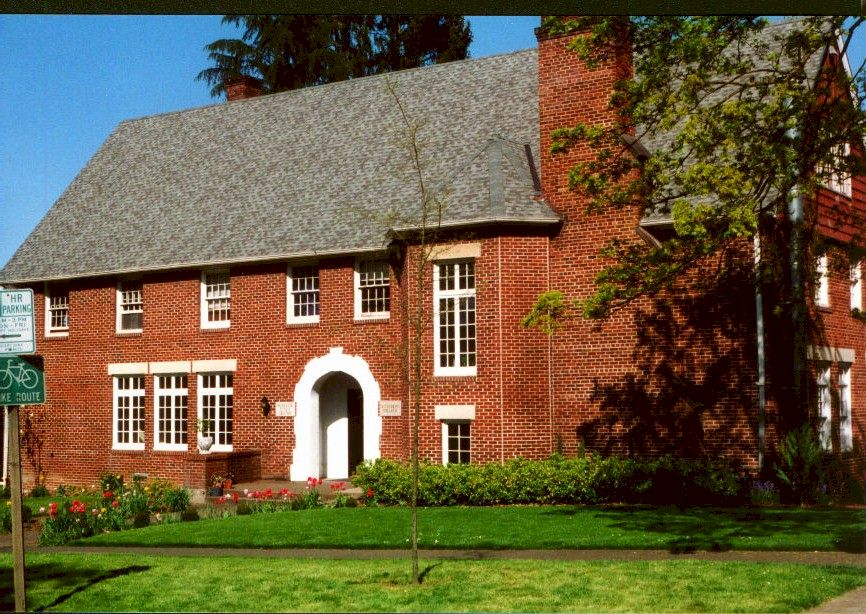
Gutenberg College

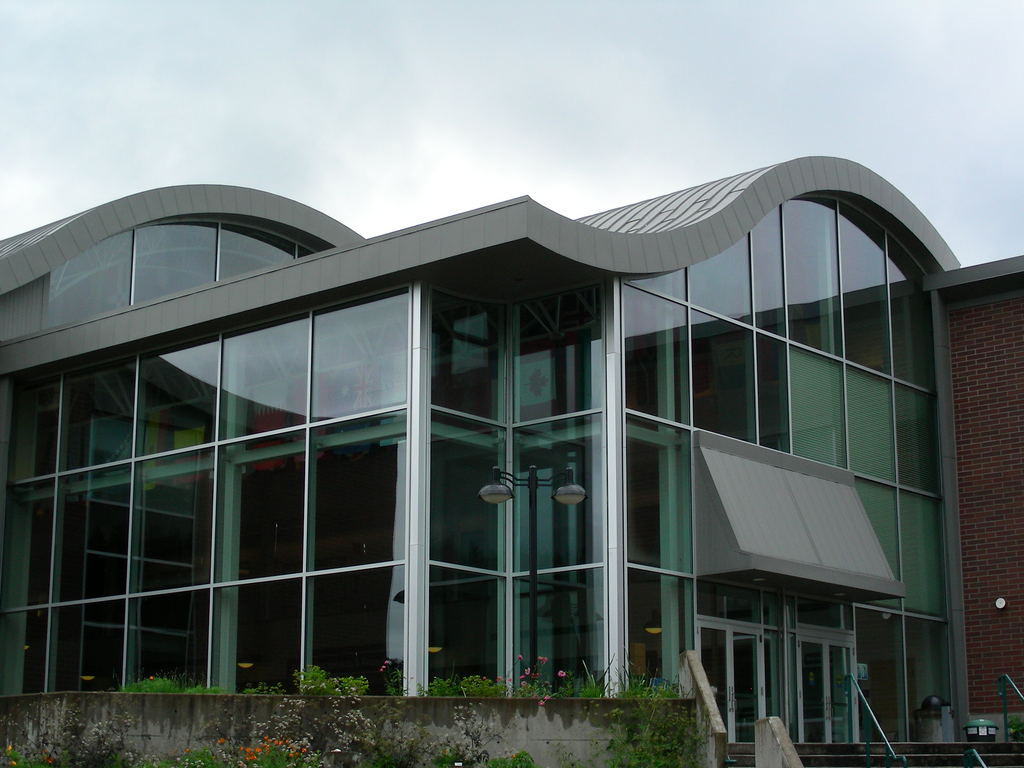
Lane Community College Building

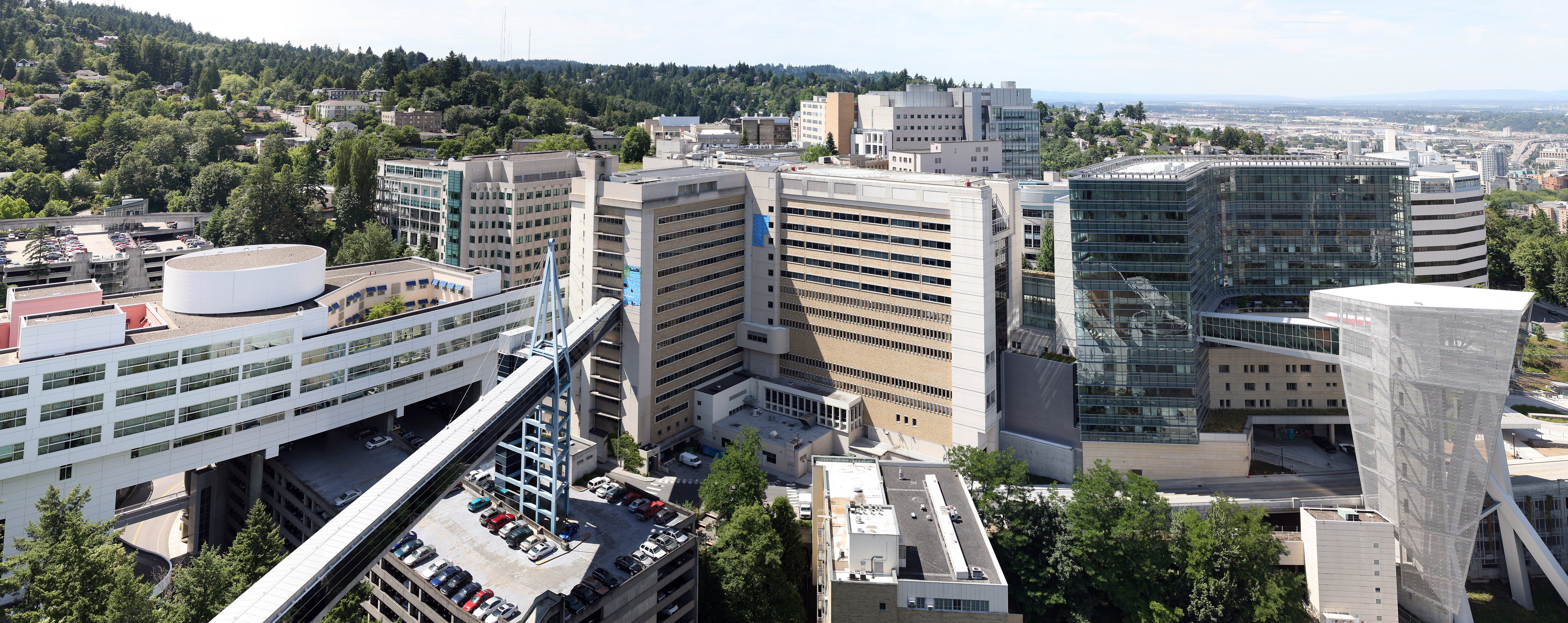
Oregon Health & Science University

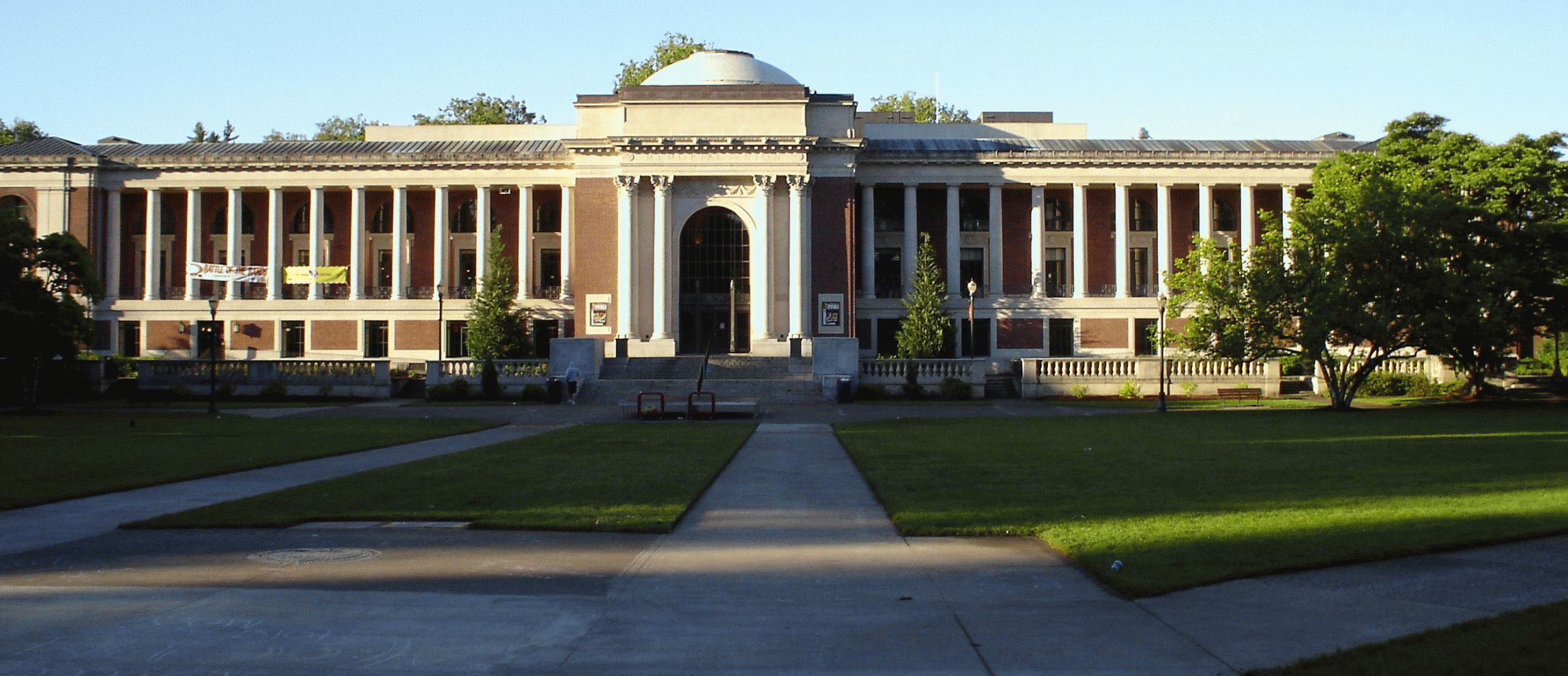
Oregon State University

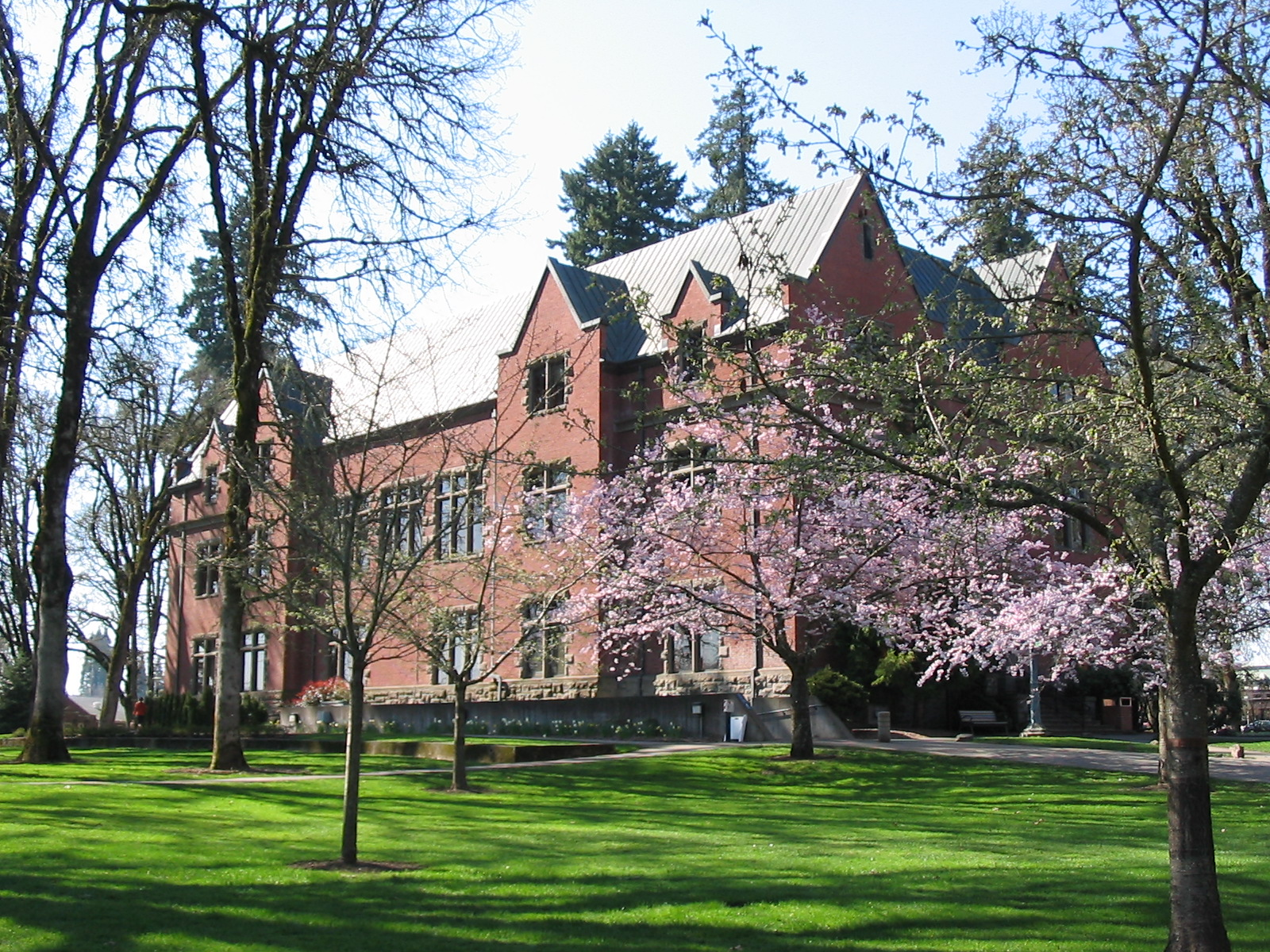
Pacific University

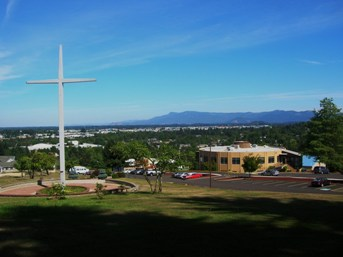
New Hope Christian College

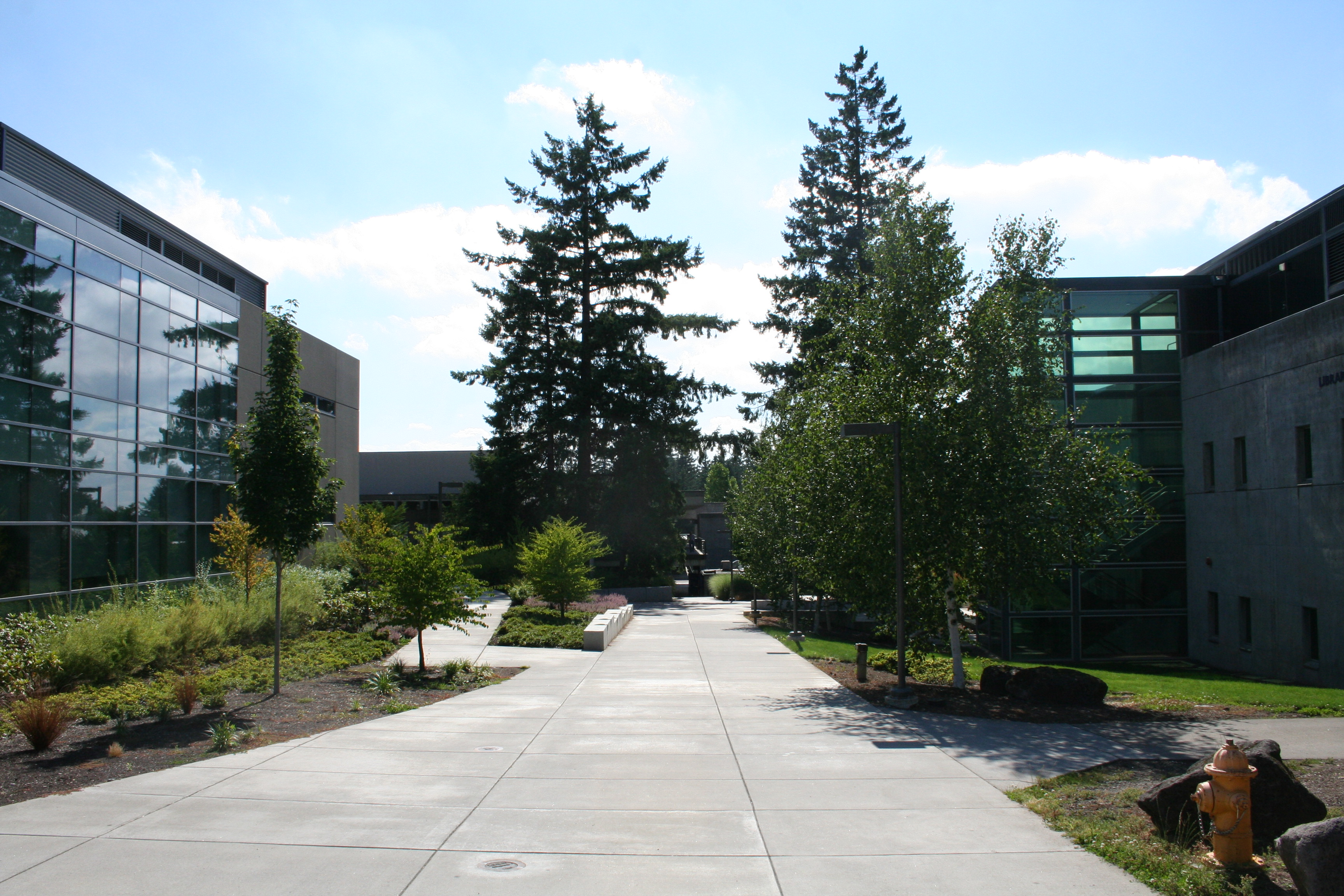
Portland Community College

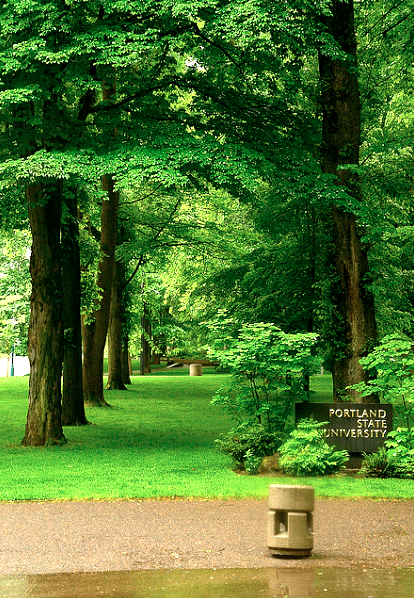
Portland State University

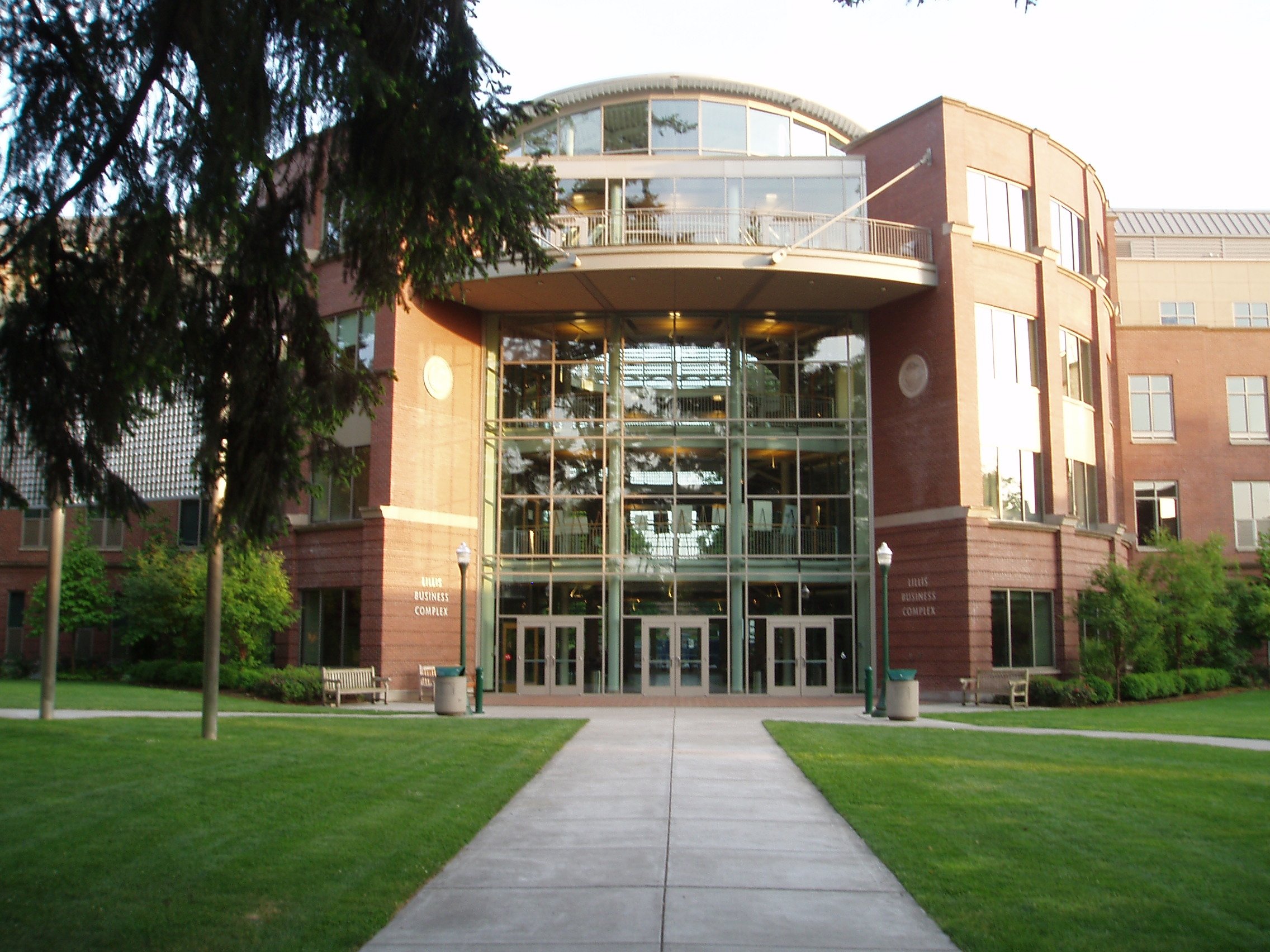
University of Oregon

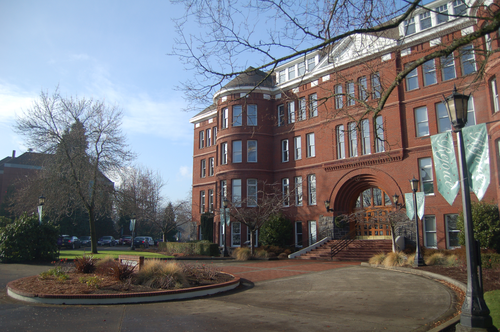
University of Portland

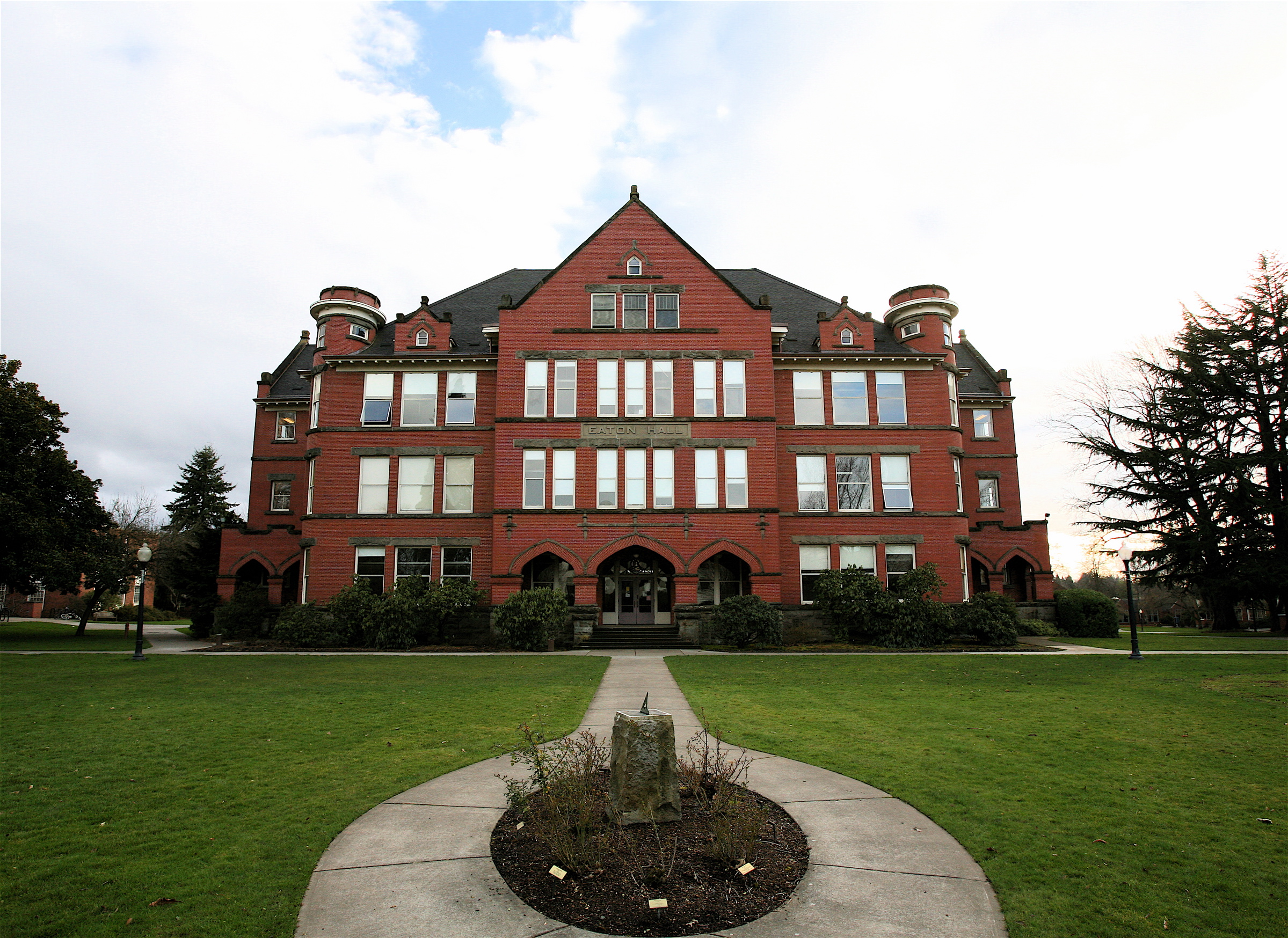
Willamette University

School	Main location	Control	Type	Enrollment (Fall 2024)	Founded
American College of Healthcare Sciences	Portland	Private (for-profit)	Health professions school	1,052	1978
Blue Mountain Community College	Pendleton	Public	Associate's college	1,407	1962
Bushnell University	Eugene	Private (Disciples of Christ)	Master's university	761	1895
Baker Technical Institute	Baker City	Public	Technical College		2021
Central Oregon Community College	Bend	Public	Associate's college	4,332	1949
Chemeketa Community College	Salem	Public	Associate's college	8,098	1969
Clackamas Community College	Oregon City	Public	Associate's college	5,545	1966
Clatsop Community College	Astoria	Public	Associate's college	754	1958
Columbia Gorge Community College	The Dalles	Public	Associate's college	812	1977
Corban University	Salem	Private (Baptist)	Master's university	1,029	1935
Eastern Oregon University	La Grande	Public	Master's university	2,894	1929
George Fox University	Newberg	Private (Quaker)	Research university	4,916	1891
Gutenberg College	Eugene	Private (Protestant)	Faith-related institution	14	1994
Klamath Community College	Klamath Falls	Public	Associate's college	1,834	1996
Lane Community College	Eugene	Public	Associate's college	6,810	1964
Lewis & Clark College	Portland	Private	Baccalaureate college	3,504	1867
Linfield University	McMinnville: Portland	Private (Baptist)	Baccalaureate college	1,709	1858
Linn–Benton Community College	Albany	Public	Associate's college	5,242	1966
Mount Angel Seminary	St. Benedict	Private (Catholic)	Faith-related institution	127	1887
Mt. Hood Community College	Gresham	Public	Associate's college	6,476	1966
National University of Natural Medicine	Portland	Private	Health professions school	414	1956
New Hope Christian College	Eugene	Private (Pentecostal)	Faith-related institution	56	1925
Oregon Coast Community College	Newport: Lincoln City; Toledo; Waldport	Public	Associate's college	470	1987
Oregon Health & Science University	Portland	Public	Medical school	2,942	1887
Oregon Institute of Technology	Klamath Falls: Wilsonville	Public	Master's university	5,299	1947
Oregon State University	Corvallis: Bend; Portland; Newport	Public	Research university	38,459	1868
Pacific Bible College	Medford	Private	Faith-related institution	22	1991
Pacific University	Forest Grove: Eugene	Private	Research university	3,427	1849
Portland Bible College	Portland	Private	Faith-related institution		1967
Portland Community College	Portland	Public	Associate's college	53,000+	1961
Portland Fashion Institute	Portland	Private	Special focus institution	39	2010
Portland State University	Portland	Public	Research university	19,951	1946
Reed College	Portland	Private	Baccalaureate college	1,358	1908
Rogue Community College	Grants Pass: Medford; White City	Public	Associate's college	4,009	1970
Southern Oregon University	Ashland	Public	Master's university	3,209	1872
Southwestern Oregon Community College	Coos Bay	Public	Associate's college	1,551	1961
Sumner College	Portland	Private (for-profit)	Associate's college	532	1974
Tillamook Bay Community College	Tillamook	Public	Associate's college	587	1981
Treasure Valley Community College	Ontario: Caldwell	Public	Associate's college	1,483	1962
Umpqua Community College	Roseburg	Public	Associate's college	2,582	1964
University of Oregon	Eugene: Portland	Public	Research university	24,404	1876
University of Portland	Portland	Private (Catholic)	Master's university	3,285	1901
University of Western States	Portland	Private	Health professions school	959	1904
Warner Pacific University	Portland	Private (Church of God)	Baccalaureate college	635	1937
Western Oregon University	Monmouth	Public	Master's university	3,722	1856
Western Seminary	Portland	Private (Christian)	Faith-related institution	755	1927
Willamette University	Salem	Private	Baccalaureate college	2,180	1842

== Out-of-state institutions ==
Several schools based in other states offer degree programs at locations in Oregon:

- The for-profit school Concorde Career College has a campus in Portland.
- Embry-Riddle Aeronautical University in Florida offers aviation programs at Portland International Airport.
- Walla Walla University's School of Nursing in Washington has a campus in Portland, where its junior and senior classes are taught.
- Western University of Health Sciences in California operates an osteopathic medical school, the College of Osteopathic Medicine of the Pacific, Northwest, in Lebanon.

== Defunct institutions ==
School	Location(s)	Founded	Closed	Notes/Refs
Albany College	Albany	1867	1942	Became Lewis & Clark College
Art Institute of Portland	Portland	1963	2018	Dream Center permanently closed 18 Art Institute schools at end of 2018.
Ashland College & Normal School	Ashland	1869		Underwent name changes to Southern Oregon College (SOC) to Southern Oregon State College (SOSC) and finally to Southern Oregon University (SOU) in 1997.
Baker Business College	Baker	1891	1976	Was in operation from 1891–1976. No transcripts are available.
Baker City Normal & Business College	Baker	1887	1905	
Baker College	Baker	1969	1970	Formerly Magic Valley Christian College, which moved to Baker from Albion, Idaho in 1969. Today, the records for Baker College and Magic Valley Christian College are held at Oklahoma Christian University.
Bassist College	Portland		1998	Now called the Art Institute of Portland, which has the Bassist College transcripts.
Bethel College	Bethel	1855	1862	Merged with Western Oregon University to form, in turn, Christian College in 1865, Oregon State Normal School in 1882, Oregon Normal School in 1911, and Oregon College of Education in 1939, which is Western Oregon University today.
Blue Mountain University	La Grande	1873	1885	
Cascade Christian College	Portland	1918	1969	Records are at Seattle Pacific University.
Cascade College	Portland	1956	2009	School was operated by Oklahoma Christian University as a branch campus from 1994 to 2009. The school was formerly Columbia Christian College from 1956 to 1993. Today, the records for both Columbia Christian College and Cascade College are at Oklahoma Christian University.
Colegio Cesar Chavez	Mount Angel	1973	1983	First Chicano college in U.S. An archive on this college is available through the Oregon State University archives.
College of Philomath	Philomath	1889	1912	Early Oregon public preparatory
Columbia Christian College	Portland	1947	1993	The records for both Columbia Christian College and Cascade College (the one that closed in 2009) are at Oklahoma Christian University.
Columbia College	Eugene	1855	1860	
Columbia College of Business	Clackamas		1999	According to the Oregon Department of Education's list, the records are available at Pioneer Pacific College in Wilsonville.
Concordia University	Portland	1905	2020	
Coquille College		1890	1905	
Corvallis Academy	Corvallis	1856	1868	Forerunner of Oregon State University.
Dallas College	Dallas	1900	1914	
DeVry University	Beaverton		2015	
Eastern Oregon College	La Grande	1892	1898	Forerunner of Eastern Oregon University.
Jefferson Institute	Jefferson	1857	1899	
Jefferson Institute	Rickreall	1846		
Judson Baptist College	The Dalles	1956	1985	Records at Arizona Christian University.
Le Cordon Bleu College of Culinary Arts in Portland	Portland	1983	2017	All national Le Cordon Bleu locations closed in 2017.
Liberal University	Silverton	1896	1903	
Marylhurst University	Marylhurst	1893	2018	
Mineral Springs College	Sodaville	1892	1908	
Mount Angel College	St. Benedict	1887	1973	Although the college closed, the seminary, Mount Angel Seminary, is in operation.
Multnomah College	Portland	1897	1969	Forerunner of University of Portland.
Multnomah University	Portland	1936	2024	Became a branch campus of Jessup University
National American University	Tigard		2016	
North Pacific College	Portland	1899	1945	Dental school absorbed into Oregon Health & Science University and optometry school absorbed into Pacific University.
Oregon City College	Oregon City	1849	1858	Assets donated to McMinnville College.
Oregon College of Art	Ashland		1984	The records went to Pacific College of Art & Design, and since then, Pacific College of Art & Design has closed.
Oregon College of Art and Craft	Portland	1907	2019	Unsuccessfully tried to merge with other local universities before closing in Spring 2019.
Oregon College of Oriental Medicine	Portland	1983	2024	
Oregon Denturist College	Milwaukie		1993	
Oregon Graduate Institute	Beaverton	1963	2001	Originally the Oregon Graduate Center until 1989. Merged with Oregon Health & Science University in 2001.
Oregon Law School	Salem and Portland	1902	1922	Not to be confused with the University of Oregon School of Law.
Oregon School of Design	Portland		1992	
Pacific College of Art & Design	Medford			Lost its tax-exempt status.
Pacific Northwest College of Art	Portland	1909	2021	Merged with Willamette University, now a constituent college of that institution.
Pioneer Pacific College	Beaverton			
Philomath College	Philomath			
Portland University	Portland	1891	1900	Was a Methodist school with ties to Willamette University. Campus and buildings sold to the Catholic Church and became the campus for the University of Portland.
Saint Francis College		1885	1905	
Saint Joseph College		1844	1849	
Saint Michael's College	Portland	1871	1928	
Sublimity College	Sublimity	1857	1860	
Whitney Business College	Baker	1887	1891	

== See also ==
- Lists of Oregon-related topics
- Higher education in the United States
- Lists of American institutions of higher education
- List of college athletic programs in Oregon
- List of recognized higher education accreditation organizations
- Lists of universities and colleges
- Lists of universities and colleges by country
