= Pacific Bible College =

Pacific Bible College can refer to

- Pacific Baptist Bible College, Long Beach, California
- Pacific Bible College (Medford, Oregon), Medford, Oregon, United States
- Pacific Bible College (Papua New Guinea), Pabrabuk, Nebilyer, Western Highlands, Papua New Guinea
- Pacific Islands Bible College, Guam
- Pacific Life Bible College, Surrey, British Columbia, Canada, formerly known as Pacific Bible College
- Point Loma Nazarene University, formerly known as Pacific Bible College
- Warner Pacific College, formerly known as Pacific Bible College
- Wellington Pacific Bible College, Wellington, New Zealand
