= Oregon Coast Community College =

Public college in Newport, Oregon, US

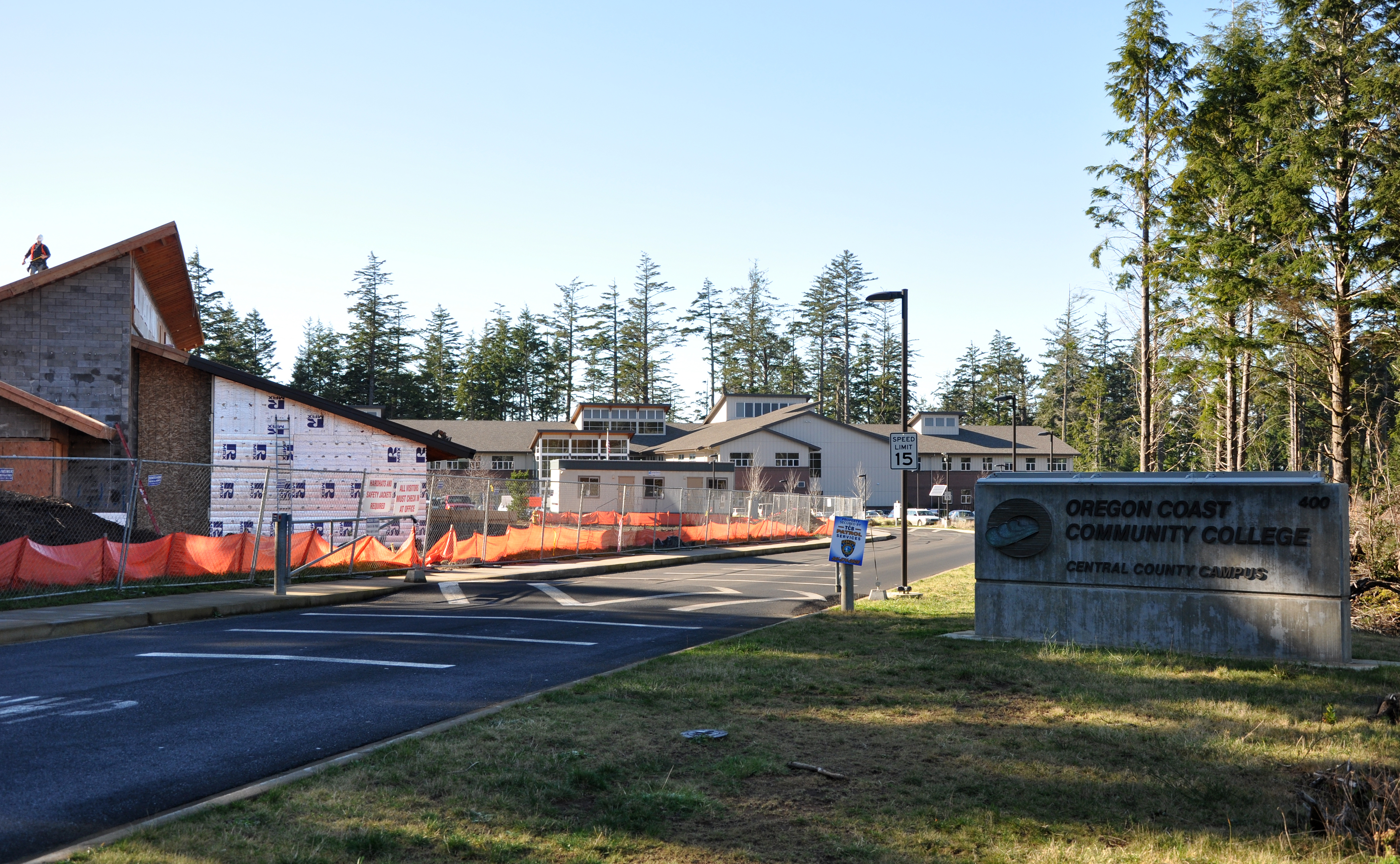
- Entrance to Newport campus
- Motto: Oceanus Opportunitatis (An Ocean of Opportunity)
- Type: Public community college
- Established: 1987
- Academic affiliations: Space-grant
- President: Marshall Mease Roache
- Administrative staff: 45
- Students: 2,036
- Location: Newport, Oregon, United States; 44.603°N 124.047°W
- Campus: 28 acres (11 ha)
- Mascot: Waverly the Shark
- Website: oregoncoast.edu

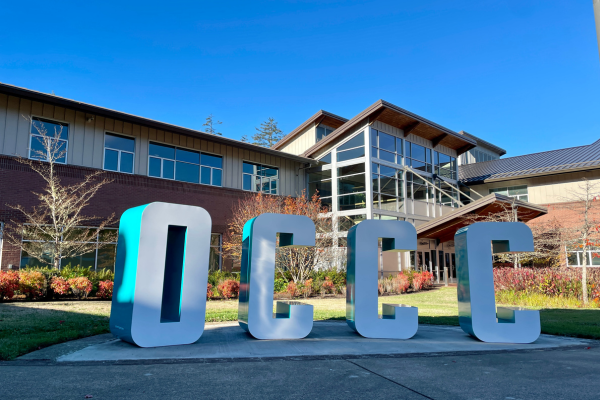
Central County Campus in Newport

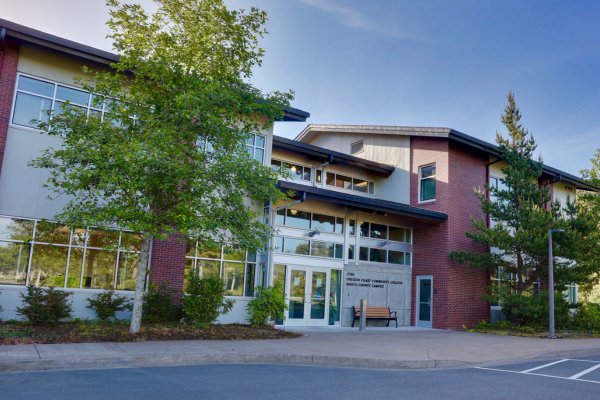
OCCC's North County Center, in Lincoln City

Oregon Coast Community College (OCCC) is a public community college in Newport, Oregon. OCCC serves students in Lincoln County and has approximately 2,000 students and a faculty of 45 people. Of the 17 community colleges in Oregon, only Klamath Community College is younger, and only Tillamook Bay Community College has fewer students.

== History ==
OCCC held its first classes in 1987, meeting in whatever spare space the staff could find. "You could be teaching in a church basement, fire station, real estate office," former college president Patrick O'Connor recalled. The following year, OCCC found a permanent home in a building formerly known as "Jake's High Tide Bar".

In 2004, local voters approved a $23.5 million bond levy, which was used to build three buildings between Lincoln City and Waldport.

In 2020, just weeks before the onset of the Pandemic, OCCC became officially independent accredited for the first time in its 30-plus year history. Today, graduates of Oregon Coast Community College receive diplomas bearing the institution's name and seal.

In May 2024, voters approved - by a two-to-one margin - a bond measure to construct a new trades education facility on the College's Central County Campus in Newport, and to upgrade, modernize and renovate its existing facilities.

== Facilities ==
OCCC consists of four learning centers in the communities of Newport, Waldport, Toledo, and Lincoln City. The Central Campus in Newport consists of the main campus structure (77,677 sq. ft.) and the Aquarium Science Building (9,274 sq. ft.), which are located on 20 acres of newly developed timber land in the South Beach area. The Aquarium Science facility is equipped with an animal holding laboratory, a teaching lab, a food prep area, and a water quality/animal health lab. Each facility was engineered and constructed to Leadership in Energy and Environmental Design (LEED) Silver standards by meeting energy efficiency and indoor air quality criteria. The North Center (25,025 sq. ft.), in Lincoln City, is situated near Taft High School, which supports a considerable enrollment of Taft students in OCCC courses. The South Center (4,200 sq. ft.), in Waldport, is adjacent to Waldport High School and Crestview School. The Oregon Coast Welding Laboratory is based across from the Shipyard at the Port of Toledo and is home to the largest of the College's welding labs (the other being at Taft High School in Lincoln City).

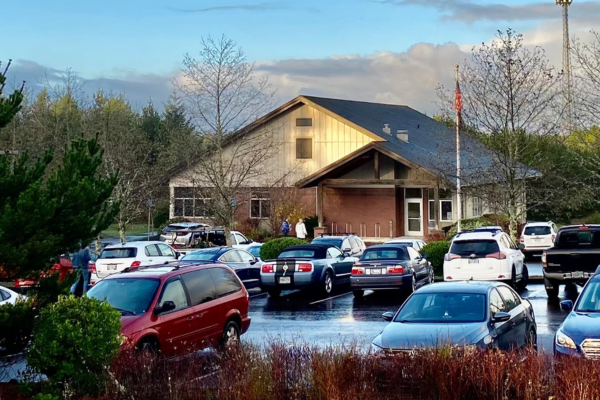
OCCC South County Center, in Waldport

== Aquarium Science Program ==
Oregon Coast Community College offers a degree program in aquarium science, and is the only college in the United States to do so. There are two programs, one to obtain an associate's degree and the other a one-year certification for those with a bachelor's degree or higher in life sciences. Because of the limited number of places available (22 at present), applicants must apply early and are interviewed by several aquarists and biologists. Classes offered range from Biology of Captive Fish and Aquatic Animal Health Management to a scuba diving course. Those studying for either their associate degree or their one-year certification end with an internship at a public aquarium, zoo, fish hatchery, or marine laboratory.

== Small Business Development Center ==
The College's Small Business Development Center (SBDC) has served Lincoln County business for more than 30 years, offering no-cost business advising to any one requesting it, in addition to workshops covering everything from fundamental (and timeless) accounting principles, to cutting-edge technology and tools. These various services and supports are designed and regularly updated to help Lincoln County businesses compete globally with capacities and supports that belie their rural Oregon location.

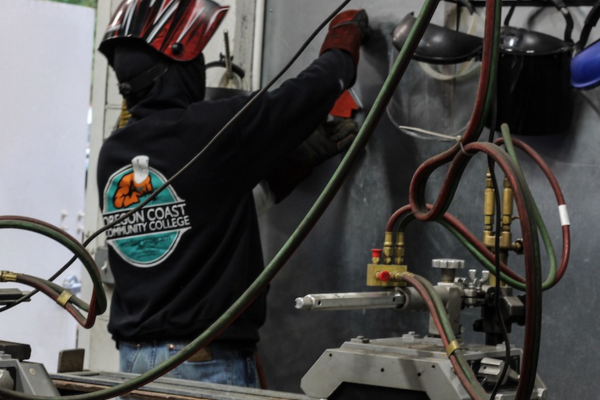
Inside the OCCC Welding Laboratory in Toledo

== See also ==
- List of Oregon community colleges
