= North Pacific College =

Private college in Portland, Oregon (1899–1945)

North Pacific College of Oregon
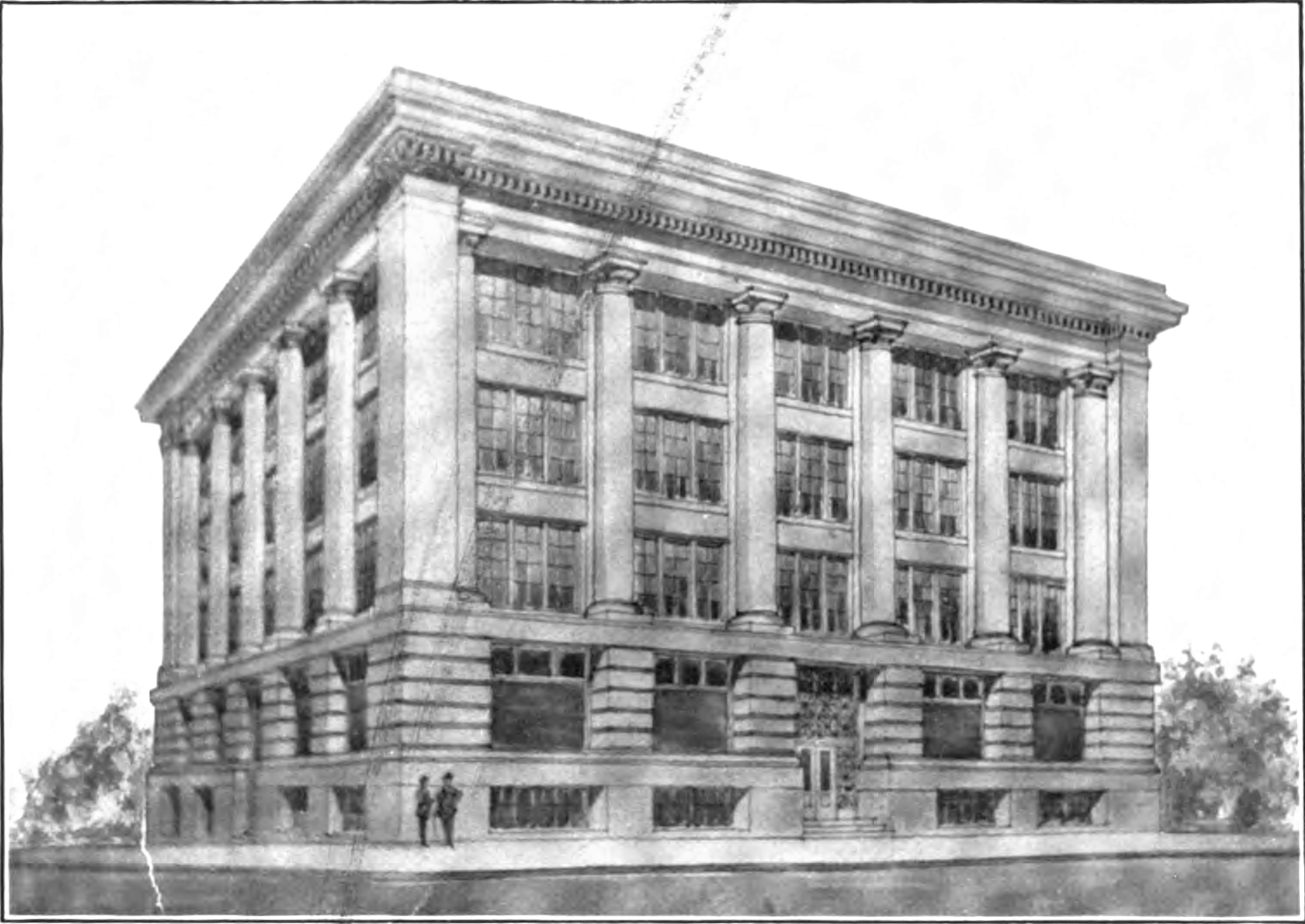
- Drawing of the 1911 building
- Former name: North Pacific College of Dentistry
- Type: Private
- Active: 1899–1945
- Location: Portland, Oregon, United States; 45.52891°N 122.65983°W
- Fate: Portions merged into Pacific University and the University of Oregon School of Medicine (now OHSU)

North Pacific College was a private, post-secondary educational institution located in Portland in the U.S. state of Oregon. A professional school, North Pacific had pharmacy, dental, and optometry programs. The dental program was purchased by the state of Oregon and merged into the University of Oregon School of Medicine and now exists as the Oregon Health & Science University School of Dentistry. The optometry school was merged into Pacific University and still exists as the Pacific University College of Optometry.

== History ==
The foundations of the school started in the 1890s in Tacoma, Washington, when physicians in that city sought to compete with Seattle by opening a dental school before the University of Washington could establish their own school. Meanwhile, in Portland, Dr. Herbert C. Miller had been asked by the University of Oregon to lead a group to investigate adding a dental school to the School of Medicine in Portland. While Miller's group decided it was premature to start a school in Portland, the Tacoma group founded the Tacoma College of Dental Surgery in 1893. Soon after, the Tacoma school moved to Portland, while Dr. Miller and a group of Portland dentists founded the Oregon College of Dentistry in 1898.

After competing for a short time, the two dental schools merged in 1900 to create the North Pacific College of Dentistry. First located at northwest Fifteenth Avenue at Couch Street, the first class graduated in 1900 with five graduates. The school added the North Pacific College of Pharmacy in 1908, and moved into a new building in 1910 at the corner of northeast Sixth Avenue and Oregon Street. Also in 1908, the school changed its name to North Pacific College. The pharmacy school added a chapter of Kappa Psi (Beta Iota) in 1913. The school's building was expanded in 1921. That year, the North Pacific College of Optometry was added to the college. In 1940, alumnus Dr. Newton Uyesugi and Dr. Roy Clunas purchased the College of Optometry from Dr. Harry Lee Fording. After America's entry into World War II in 1941, the optometry school was closed in 1942 as Dr. Uyesugi was of Japanese ancestry and he was forced to relocate due to the Japanese exclusion orders. During World War II, the dental school was part of the V-12 Navy College Training Program, and in 1941 the pharmacy school closed. Another reason the optometry school was suspended in 1942 was that the head of the school joined the Navy.

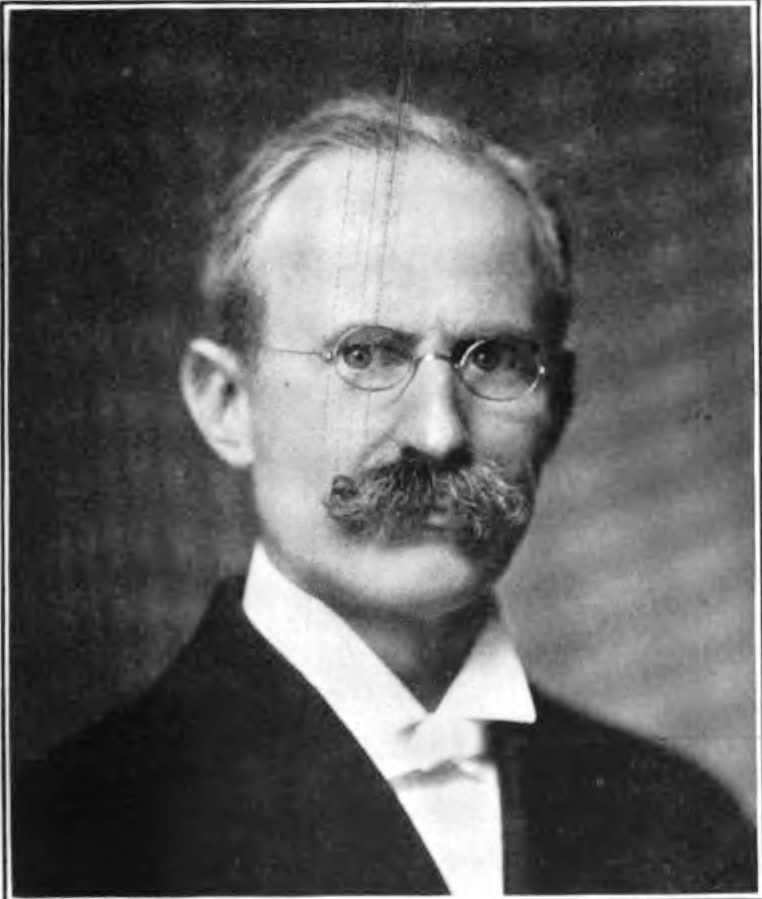
School founder Dr. Herbert Miller

Dr. Miller, who headed the school from the beginning, had approached the state about the dental school becoming affiliated with the University of Oregon School of Medicine on many occasions. Then the American Dental Association, in an effort to raise standards for dental schools, denied continued accreditation for the dental school in 1944. Part of the reasoning was the lack of affiliation with a full-university, an issue Dr. Miller had long advocated for a solution by joining the University of Oregon.

During the 1945 session of the Oregon Legislature, the assembly passed a law to allow for the school to join the University of Oregon. The school was then sold to the state for no cost, with the main provision being that the dental school remain in northeast Portland for at least five years. On July 1, 1945, North Pacific Dental College joined the University of Oregon. On August 1 of that same year the optometry program joined Forest Grove's Pacific University. The School of Optometry was located at northeast 41st Avenue and Sandy Boulevard.

== Legacy ==
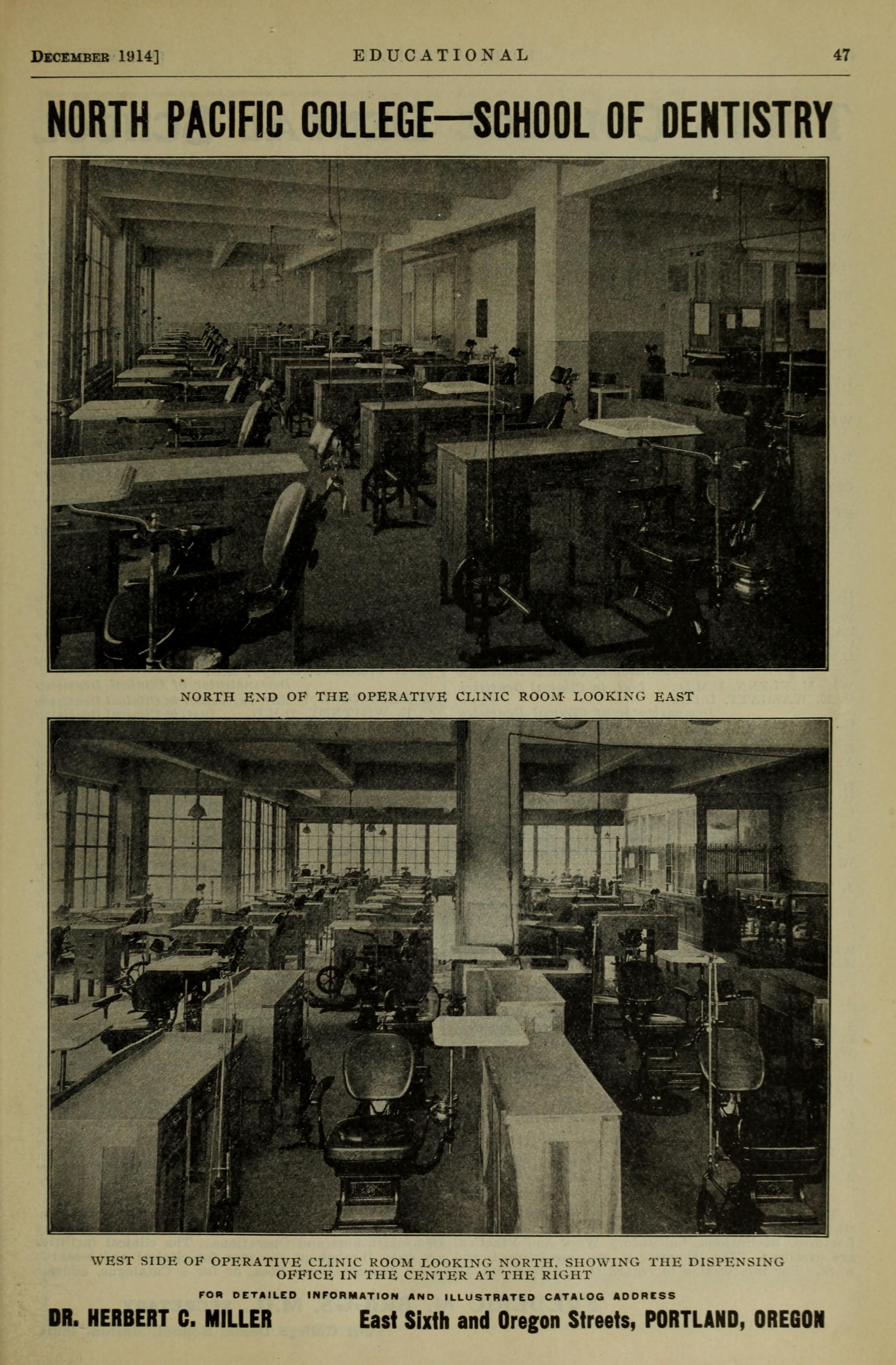
North Pacific College of Dentistry, Portland, Oregon, 1914

During its operation, the dental school graduated more than 3,300 dentists. The dental school still exists as the Oregon Health & Science University School of Dentistry. The optometry school still exists as the Pacific University College of Optometry.

After the merger of the dental school into the University of Oregon's medical school, a controversy arose over the relationship between the dental school and the university. Eventually members of the Oregon State Dental Association sued the Oregon State Board of Higher Education for a declaratory judgment on the interpretation of Chapter 160 of Oregon Laws 1945. That law had merged the North Pacific College of Oregon's dental program into the state's medical school, and with it, established an advisory board made up of members of the Oregon State Dental Association to advise the state board on operating the school. The issue was whether the dental school was a subdivision of (the former) Oregon University System, or was it a subdivision of the University of Oregon. In 1954, the Oregon Supreme Court ruled that the dental college was a subdivision the higher education system, and not directly under the control of the University of Oregon.

== Notable alumni ==
- Edgar Buchanan, dentist and later actor with a long career in both film and television
- Newton K. Wesley, optometrist and early pioneer of contact lens
- Oscar Willing, dentist and amateur golfer
