= Daniel A. Poling =

American Brethren clergyman

The Reverend Daniel A. Poling
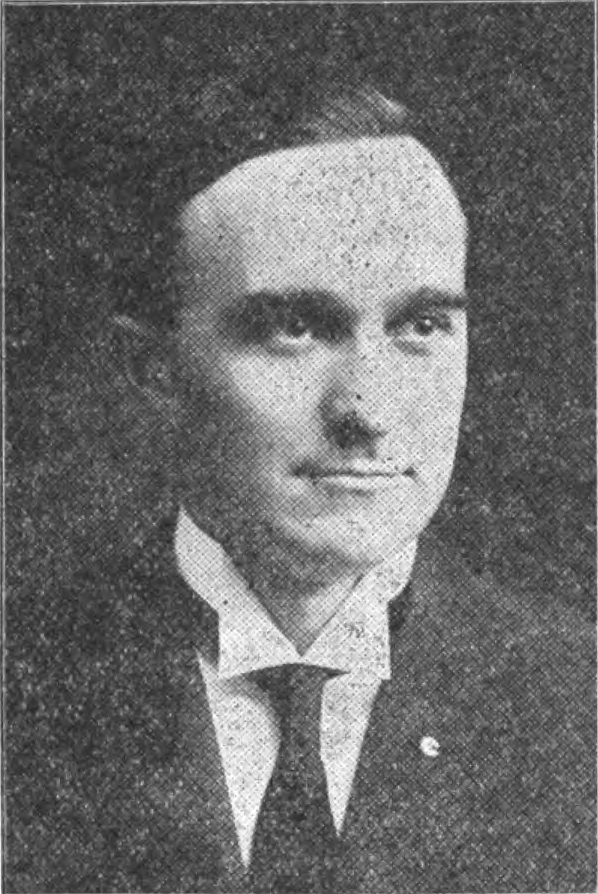
- Poling in 1913
- Born: November 30, 1884; Portland, Oregon, U.S.
- Died: February 7, 1968 (aged 83); Philadelphia, Pennsylvania, U.S.
- Occupation: Evangelical Association clergyman

Daniel Alfred Poling (November 30, 1884 – February 7, 1968) was an American clergyman of the Evangelical Association.

== Early life and family ==
Poling was born in Portland, Oregon, to Charles Cupp Poling and Savilla Kring Poling in 1884. His father was also a minister, and two of his brothers, Paul N. Poling and Charles S. Poling, became clergymen as well. Charles Cupp Poling came to Oregon as a missionary of the Evangelical Association in 1883, shortly before Daniel Poling's birth, and was one of the ministers who helped found the United Brethren Church. Daniel Poling graduated from Dallas College in Dallas, Oregon, which his father had founded. He married Susan Jane Vandersall in 1906. Among their children was Clark V. Poling, one of the Four Chaplains lost aboard the SS Dorchester in World War II.

== Minister ==
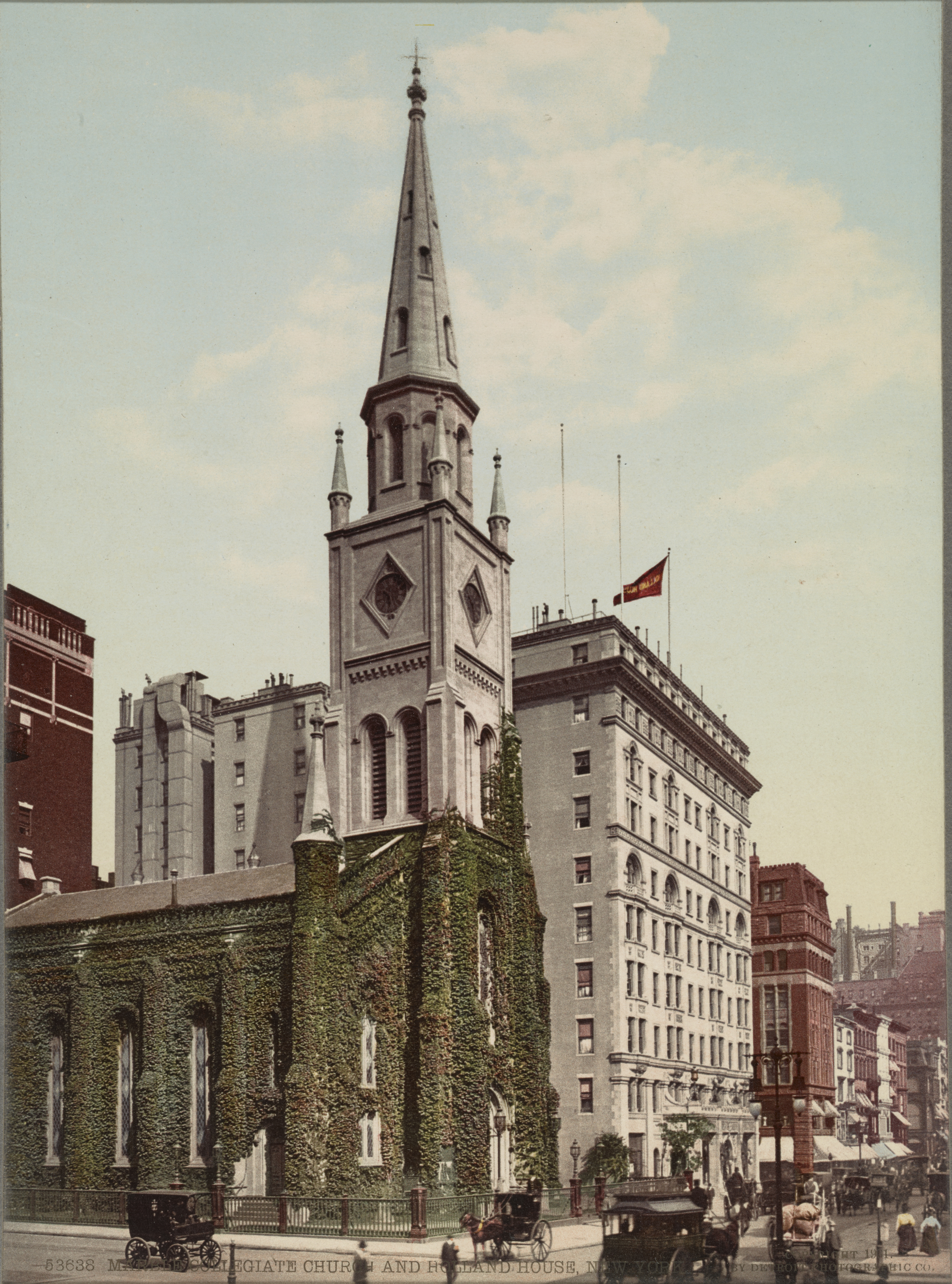
The Marble Collegiate Church around the time Poling preached there

Poling was ordained in the Evangelical Association in 1906 in Carey, Ohio. He quickly became involved in the campaign to prohibit alcohol in the United States. During World War I, Poling helped to organize a unit of chaplains to serve with the American Expeditionary Force in France. He served near the front, was involved in an enemy gas attack, and received a citation from the United States government. From 1922 to 1939, he preached at the Marble Collegiate Church in Manhattan, and began giving weekly radio addresses. While there, he came to know Norman Vincent Peale, who later described Poling as "one of the greatest servants of Jesus Christ in this age or any other". In 1927, he became the editor of the Christian Herald, a non-denominational Protestant journal that became more successful under his leadership. He would remain at the Herald's helm until 1966. The same year, he became the head of the Young People's Society of Christian Endeavour.

He resigned from the Marble Collegiate Church in 1939 to become owner of the Herald. Under his editorship, the journal continued to support American military actions, the draft, and the development of atomic weapons. Poling was also a strong proponent of the separation of church and state. After his son, Clark, was lost at sea during World War II along with three other clergymen, Poling helped found the Chapel of the Four Chaplains in Philadelphia in their memory. He served there until his death in 1968.

== Politics ==
Although he was never elected, Poling ran for several offices. He was the Prohibition Party's candidate for governor of Ohio in 1912, but polled very few votes. In 1951, having moved to Philadelphia, he was the Republican candidate for mayor in the election that year. He was defeated by Democrat Joseph S. Clark Jr. The following month, President Harry S. Truman selected Poling as an investigator into tax scandals in his administration. In 1960, he endorsed Richard M. Nixon for president, based on his distrust of John F. Kennedy's Catholic faith.

== Sources ==
Books

- Feller, Wende Vyborney (2007). "Poling, Daniel Alfred (1884-1968)". In Shearer, Benjamin F. (ed.). Home Front Heroes: A Biographical Dictionary of Americans During Wartime. Vol. 3. Westport, Connecticut: Greenwood Press. pp. 676–677. ISBN 978-0-313-33423-8.
- Greenberg, Gerald S. (2000). Historical Encyclopedia of U.S. Independent Counsel Investigations. Westport, Connecticut: Greenwood Press. pp. 273–275. ISBN 0-313-30735-0.
- Reichley, James (1985). Religion in American Public Life. Washington, D.C.: Brookings Institution. ISBN 0-8157-7377-3.

Magazine

- "Daniel A. Poling, Prohibitionist Candidate for Governor of Ohio, to be Speaker at Big Anti-Saloon League Convention". The American Issue. 8 (23): 11. June 10, 1913.

Newspapers

- "Church Pioneer Dies in Oregon at Age of 88". Williamsport Sun-Gazette. Williamsport, Pennsylvania. June 16, 1947. p. 17.
- "Daniel A. Poling Honored on 50th Year as Pastor". Daily Capital Journal. Salem, Oregon. September 29, 1956. p. 3.
- "Democrats End 67-Year GOP Rule in Philadelphia". Delaware County Daily Times. November 7, 1951.
- "Dr. Poling Dies". The Altoona Tribune. Altoona, Pennsylvania. June 16, 1947. p. 1.
- "Dr. Poling Dies at 83; Clergyman". Delaware County Daily Times. February 8, 1968.

Party political offices
Preceded by Bernard Samuel	Republican nominee for Mayor of Philadelphia; 1951	Succeeded by Thacher Longstreth
