= George Jessen =

George Jessen (1916–1987) was an optometrist who was an early pioneer of the contact lens. He is credited with being one of the first to employ the concept of orthokeratology, a direct attempt to reduce refractive error with the use of a contact lens, under the term orthofocus.

== Career ==
Jessen received his training at the Chicago College of Optometry, now called the Illinois College of Optometry. In 1976, the Contact Lens Manufacturers Association awarded him The Dr. Josef Dallos Award for "outstanding contribution to the development and advancement of the contact lens industry and for service to humanity".

Jessen worked closely with his mentor and partner, Newton K. Wesley. In Uptown Chicago, in the basement of Jessen's mother's apartment building, the two began researching a solution to Dr. Wesley's vision problems. Wesley suffered from keratoconus, a degenerative disease of the cornea that defies correction with glasses, and he had also been told by experts that he'd eventually lose his sight completely. Wesley believed that contact lenses could help him to see and possibly save his vision. But, the lenses that were available in the 1940s, known as scleral lenses, couldn't be worn for long periods of time. Besides this disadvantage, scleral contact lenses, at the time, mostly came from Germany and were made of hand-blown glass. Due to the war, contact lenses were unavailable to be shipped from Germany. During this time plastics such as methyl methacrylate were coming into the marketplace. Methyl methacrylate was used mostly in the windshields of fighter planes. Doctors were finding that when the windshields broke, and the plastic flew into the pilot's eyes, their eyes did not react the same way an eye usually did to a foreign body. This is because methyl methacrylate is proved to be an inert substance like glass, and did not create a rejection response from the eyes.

Using methyl methacrylate, the partners pioneered a new type of contact lens. Wesley and Jessen worked to develop the plastic lenses known as the rigid corneal contact lens. The corneal lens fit floated on the cornea, unlike its scleral predecessor, which rested on the sclera or white of the eye and bridged the cornea. The end product was a lens that was smaller, thinner and longer-wearing than the scleral lens. This vast difference in wearing duration between the scleral and corneal lenses was due to the fact that the corneal lens allowed for a vast increase in the circulation of tears. The tears carried oxygen to the cornea. Oxygen was needed to keep the cornea from experiencing edema, which temporarily clouded the cornea. Also, the scleral lenses required a mold of each patient's eye while the corneal lenses did not. This made corneal lens better suited to the methods of mass production. Because of the ease of production, corneal contact lenses created a market for cosmetic contact lenses in addition to therapeutic contact lenses.

The two founded The Plastic Contact Lens Company, with the goal of making contact lenses easier to manufacture, accessible to more people, and lenses that could be worn for long periods of time.

In 1978 the pair gained Food and Drug Administration approval of their hydrogel soft contact lenses. Besides founding the Wesley-Jessen Corporation, they also created the National Eye Research Foundation, which presents the Dr. George N. Jessen Award for Clinical Excellence each year at its annual meeting. Wesley-Jessen was acquired by Schering Plough in 1980, and by CIBA Vision by 2001.
