= Newton K. Wesley =

American optometrist

Newton K. (Uyesugi) Wesley (c. 1909 – July 21, 2011) was an optometrist and an early pioneer of the contact lens. Wesley was a partner with George Jessen in the development and advancement of contact lens. Together they founded the Wesley-Jessen Corporation as well as the National Eye Research Foundation. Wesley-Jessen was acquired by Schering Plough in 1980 then and CIBA Vision by 2001.

== Career ==
Dr. Wesley was the president of Oregon's Japanese-American Citizens League at one point. Governor Charles Sprague advocated for him to be allowed into medical school despite anti-Japanese sentiment at the time.
