= Dallas College (Oregon) =

Dallas College was a post-secondary educational institution in Dallas, Polk County, Oregon, United States. It was affiliated with the United Evangelical Church and operated from 1900 to 1914.

The college grew out of a seminary the church founded in Lafayette in 1889. The seminary moved to Dallas in 1900 and merged with La Creole Academy (founded in 1855) to form La Creole Academy and Dallas College, which offered classes at both the high school and college level.

Clergyman Daniel A. Poling was a member of the college's first class, which graduated in 1904. His father, Charles C. Poling, was the college's first president.

== See also ==
- Clark V. Poling, grandson of Charles C. Poling, one of the "Four Chaplains" of the sinking of the SS Dorchester
