= Klamath Community College =

College in Klamath Falls, Oregon, U.S.

Coordinates: 42.1949°N 121.6987°W

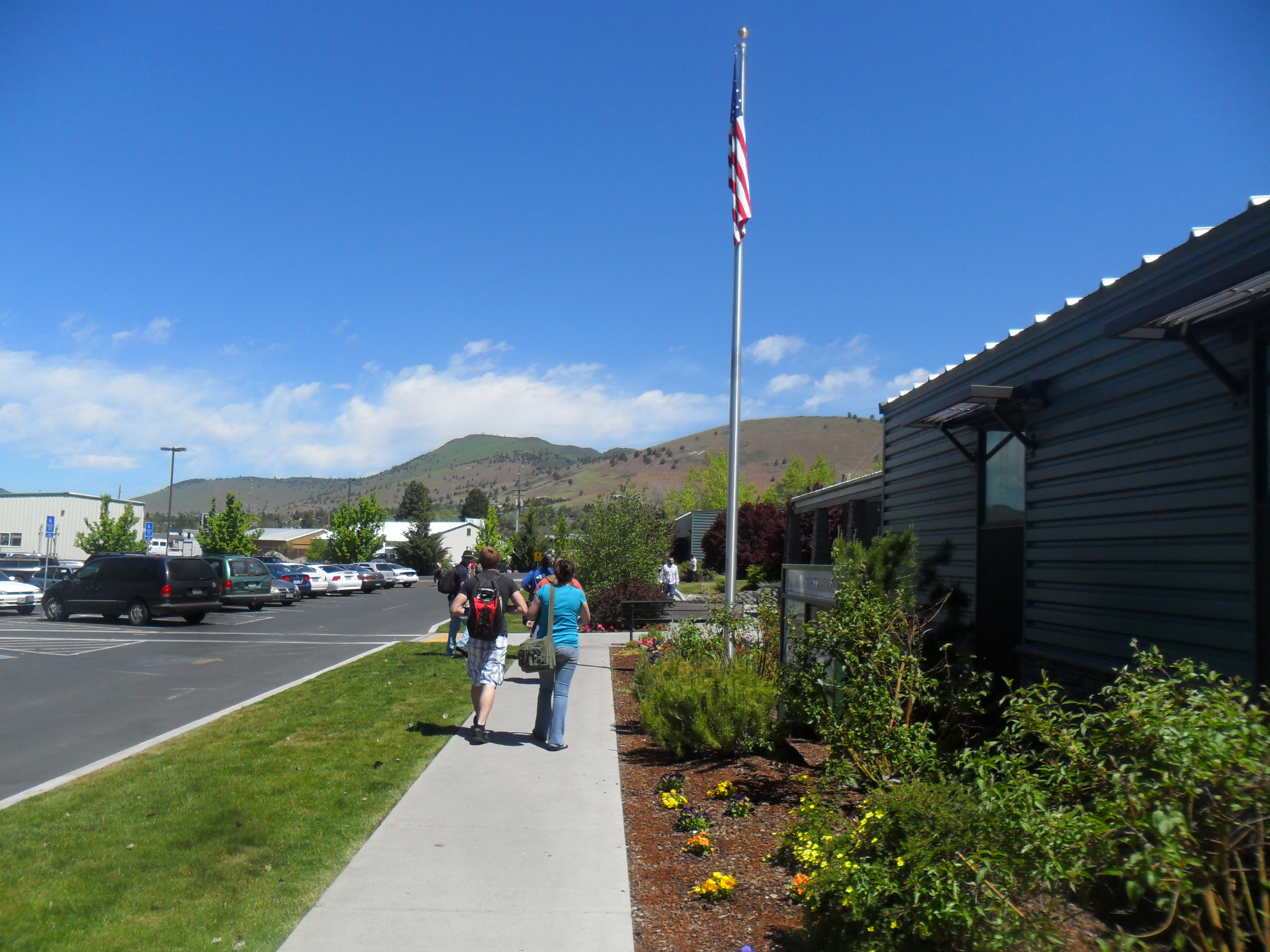
- Type: Public community college
- Established: May 21, 1996
- President: Dr. Roberto Gutierrez
- Location: Klamath Falls, Oregon, United States
- Campus: 57 acres (23 ha)
- Colors: Burgundy, silver and gold
- Nickname: Badger
- Mascot: Baxter the Badger
- Website: www.klamathcc.edu

Klamath Community College (KCC) is a public community college in Klamath Falls, Oregon. KCC's primary service area is Klamath County and Lake County in South Central Oregon. The majority of Klamath County is its official service area, while KCC has a "contract out of district" (COD) with Lake County.

The region is just north of the California border and east of the Cascade Range, with a combined area that spans approximately 14,500 square miles. Total enrollment during the 2017–2018 school year was 1,683 students, consisting of 577 full-time students and 1,106 part-time students.

== History ==
A community college service district was established by the voters of Klamath County in 1996. After several years of contracting with Rogue Community College, Oregon Institute of Technology, and Portland Community College to hold classes in rented facilities, a permanent campus was opened in 2000, situated on a 57-acre (23 ha) land on the east side of Klamath Falls.

== Academics ==
The college offers several different Associate's degree programs, which represent 50% of the degrees granted. Non-credit (community education) classes are also available, mostly less than a year degrees which represent 36% of the degrees offered by KCC, including certifications for traffic flagging, welding and wildland fire. Other degrees take at least a year but less than two years, which represent 4% of the degrees offered at KCC. Klamath Community College also offers workforce development training courses to companies and their employees.

Klamath Community College was initially accredited by the Northwest Commission on Colleges and Universities in September 2004.

=== Articulation agreements ===
Klamath Community College has articulation agreements with five Oregon universities: Eastern Oregon University, Linfield College, Oregon Institute of Technology, Oregon State University, and Southern Oregon University. Each agreement provides no loss of credit during transfer and allows students to earn a bachelor's degree while living in Klamath Falls.

== Administration ==
Klamath Community College is governed by a seven-person board. Five board members are elected by geographical zone, and two are elected at large. One representative from the college's student government participates in meetings as a non-voting member.

== See also ==
- List of Oregon community colleges
