= Oregon Health & Science University School of Dentistry =

Dental school in Portland, Oregon, U.S.

- Type: Public university
- Established: 1899; 127 years ago
- Parent institution: Oregon Health & Science University
- Dean: Dr. Ron Sakaguchi
- Location: Portland, OR, U.S. 45.5031°N 122.6718°W
- Website: ohsu.edu/sod

The Oregon Health & Science University School of Dentistry is the dental school of Oregon Health & Science University. It is located in the city of Portland, Oregon, United States. It is the only dental school in Oregon.

== History ==
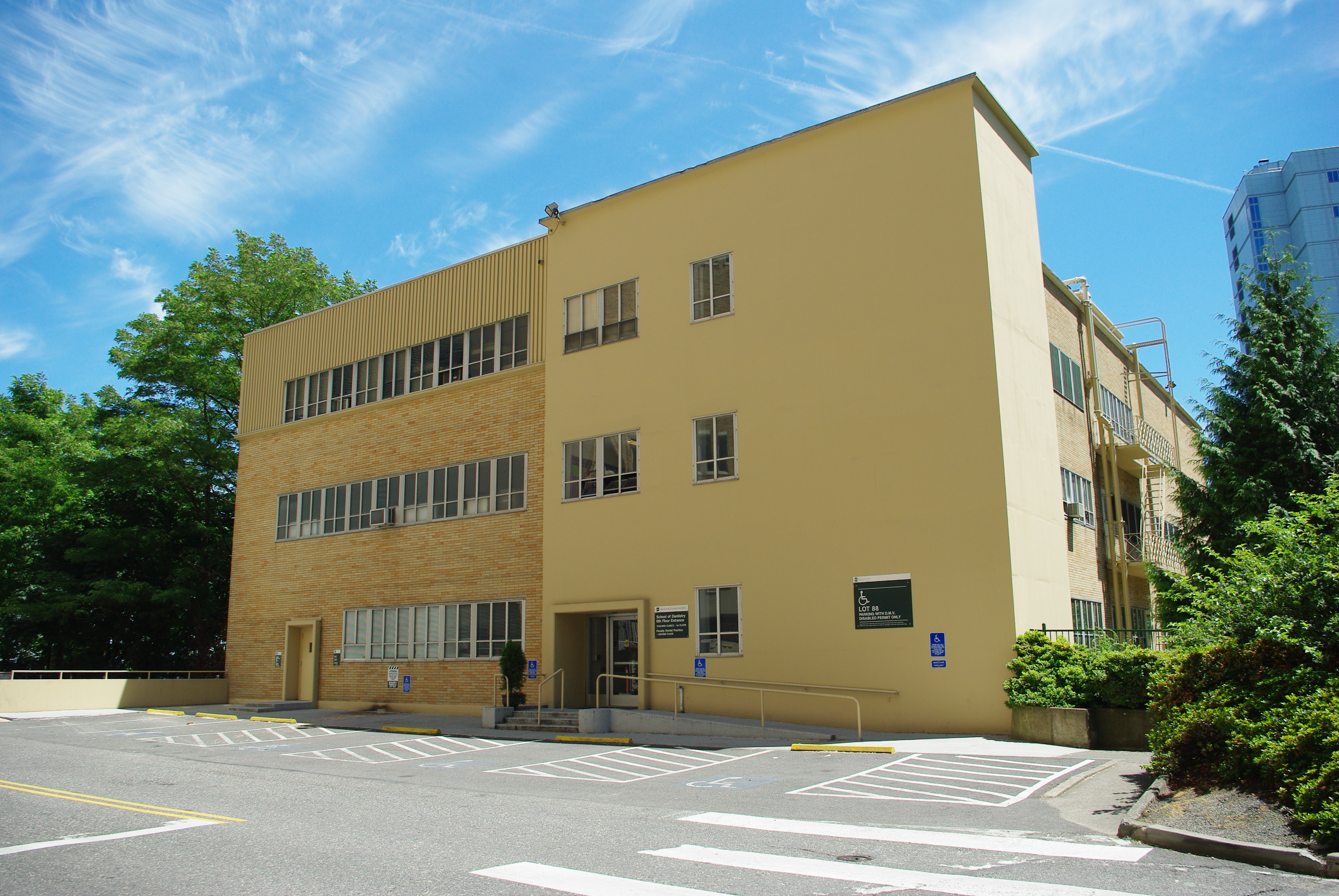
Back of the school's former home at the Marquam Hill campus

Oregon Health & Science University School of Dentistry is a part of Oregon Health & Science University. The school was established in 1899 when the Oregon College of Dentistry merged with the Tacoma College of Dental Surgery to create the North Pacific Dental College in Portland. After being renamed as North Pacific College, that school merged into the then University of Oregon Medical School in 1945.

After the merger, a controversy arose over the relationship between the dental school and the university. Eventually members of the Oregon State Dental Association sued the Oregon State Board of Higher Education for a declaratory judgment on the interpretation of the law that created the merger. The issue was whether the dental school was a subdivision of (the former ) Oregon University System, or was it a subdivision of the University of Oregon. In 1954, the Oregon Supreme Court ruled that the dental college was a subdivision of the higher education system.

Ron Sakaguchi was named the schools tenth dean in November 2021, replacing Phillip Marucha. In 2014, the School moved into the Collaborative Life Sciences Building & Skourtes Tower on OHSU's South Waterfront campus.

== Academics ==
Oregon Health & Science University School of Dentistry awards following degrees:

- Doctor of Dental Medicine

== Departments ==
Oregon Health & Science University School of Dentistry includes the following departments:

- Department of Community Dentistry
- Department of Endodontics
- Department of Integrative Biosciences
- Department of Oral & Maxillofacial Surgery
- Department of Orthodontics
- Department of Pathology & Radiology
- Department of Pediatric Dentistry
- Department of Periodontics
- Department of Restorative Dentistry

== Accreditation ==
Oregon Health & Science University School of Dentistry is accredited by American Dental Association through the Commission on Dental Accreditation.

== See also ==
- American Student Dental Association
