= Pacific Bible College (Medford, Oregon) =

- Motto: Training Students to Kingdom Think
- Type: Private
- Established: 1991
- President: Mike Robinson
- Location: Medford, Oregon, United States; 42.329453°N 122.876405°W
- Website: www.pacificbible.edu

Pacific Bible College is a private Bible college in Medford, Oregon, United States.

== History ==
In 1989 local Christian radio station owner, Perry Atkinson met with a group of pastors to discuss the possibility of a Bible college in southern Oregon. In December 1991, Dove Bible Institute was founded. The name was changed to Pacific Bible College in 2000.

== Academics ==
=== Accreditation ===
Pacific Bible College is accredited by the Commission on Accreditation of the Association of Biblical Higher Education and authorized by the State of Oregon.
