= Deputy Chief of Chaplains of the United States Army =

Position in the U. S. Army

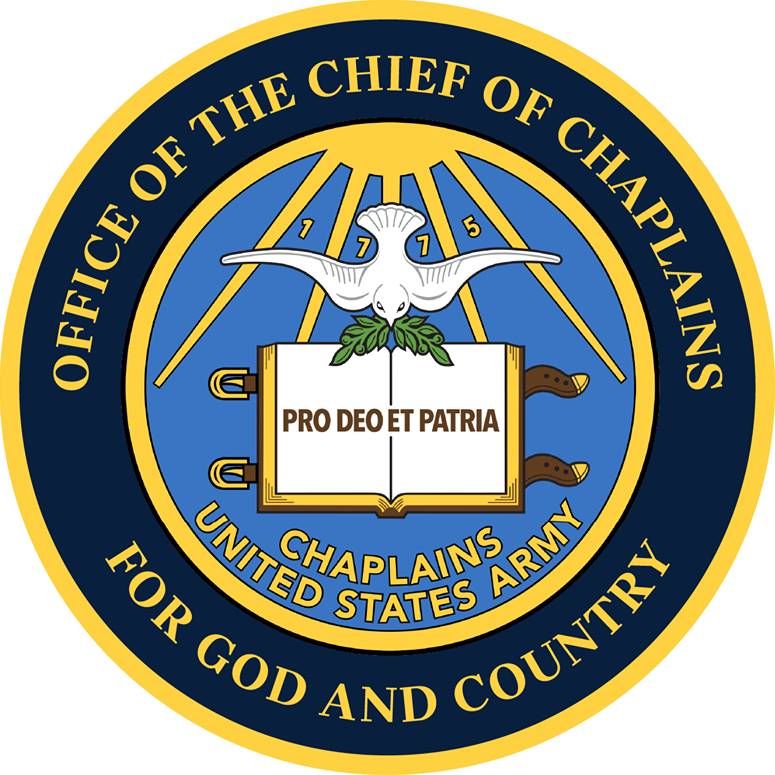
- Seal of the Office of the Chief of Chaplains

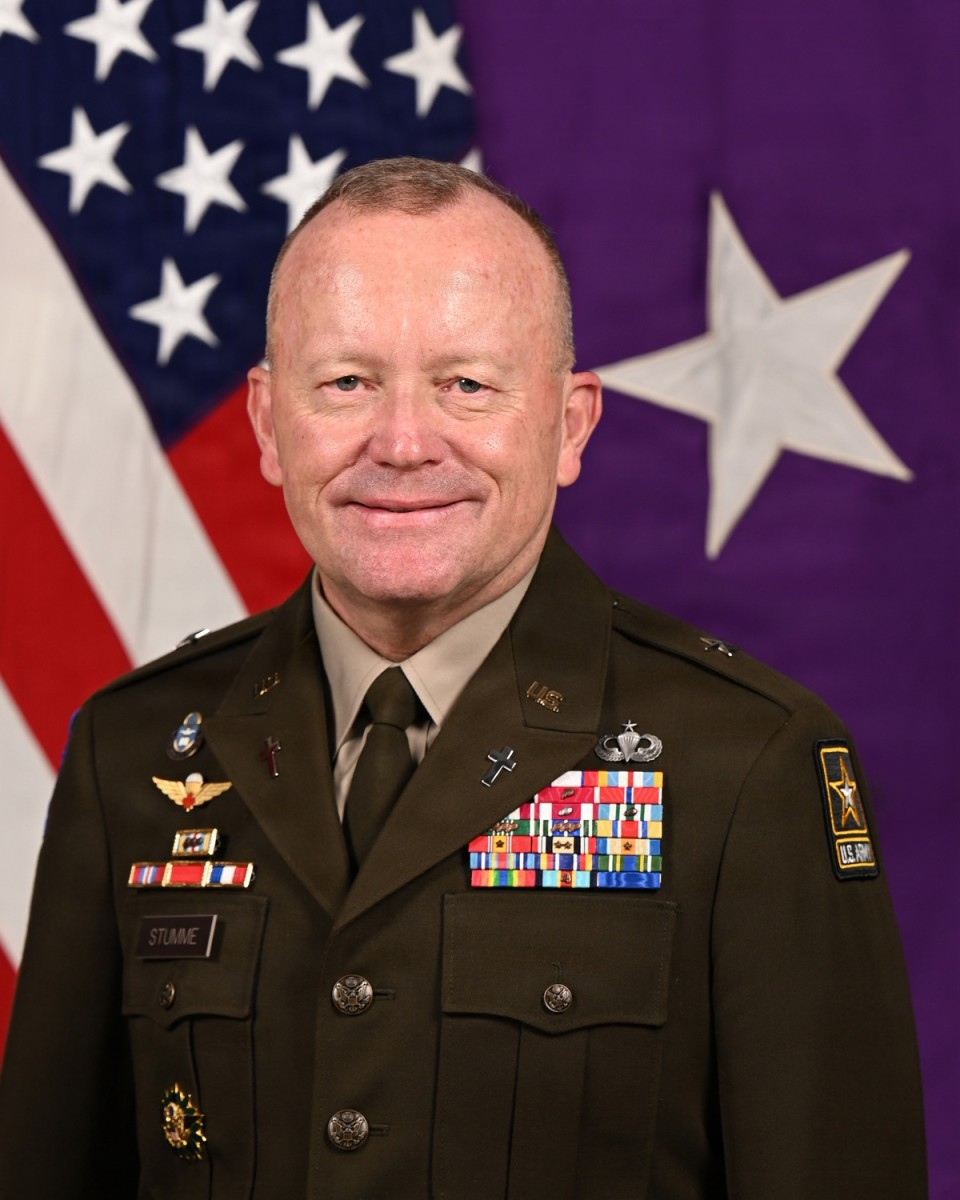
- Incumbent; CH (BG) Jack Stumme since June 2, 2026
- Formation: 1942
- First holder: CH (BG) George F. Rixey

The Deputy Chief of Chaplains (DCCH) serves as the chief strategist for the U.S. Army Chaplain Corps and senior coordinating general officer for actions assigned to Assistant Chiefs of Chaplains (Reserve Component) and the USACHCS Chief of Chaplains of the United States Army. As directed by the CCH, serves as the intermediate rater for senior-level active duty chaplains. The current DCCH is Chaplain (Brigadier General) Jack Stumme

== U.S. Army Deputy Chiefs of Chaplains ==
	Name	Photo	Denomination	Term began	Term ended
1.	CH (BG) George F. Rixey		Methodist	February 1942	July 6, 1945
2.	CH (BG) William D. Cleary		Roman Catholic	July 10, 1945	April 1946
3.	CH (COL) Patrick J. Ryan		Roman Catholic	April 1946	August 31, 1948
4.	CH (BG) James H. O'Neill		Roman Catholic	September 1, 1948	July 1952
5.	CH (BG) Patrick J. Ryan		Roman Catholic	July 1952	April 30, 1954
6.	CH (BG) Frank A. Tobey		American Baptist	July 2, 1954	October 31, 1958
7.	CH (BG) William J. Moran		Roman Catholic	November 1, 1958	January 31.1966
8.	CH (BG) Francis L. Sampson		Roman Catholic	February 14, 1966	August 17, 1967
9.	CH (BG) Ned R. Graves		Disciples of Christ	September 22, 1967 (nominated by the President to the Senate in August 1967)	December 31, 1969
10.	CH (BG) Gerhardt W. Hyatt		Lutheran	January 1, 1970	July 31, 1971
11.	CH (BG) Aloysius J. McElwee		Roman Catholic	August 1, 1971	October 31, 1973
12.	CH (BG) Thaddeus F. Malanowski		Roman Catholic	March 1974* Chaplain (COL) Leonard F. Stegman was nominated and selected in November 1973 to be the Deputy Chief of Chaplains but declined the nomination for personal reasons	July 1978
13.	CH (BG) Kermit D. Johnson		United Presbyterian	July 1978	July 1, 1979
14.	CH (BG) Patrick J. Hessian		Roman Catholic	July 2, 1979	June 30, 1982
15.	CH (BG) Paul O. Forsberg		Lutheran	October 1, 1982	November 30, 1985
16.	CH (BG) Norris L. Einertson		Lutheran	December 1, 1985	June 30, 1986
17.	CH (BG) Charles J. McDonnell		Roman Catholic	July 1, 1986	September 30, 1989
18.	CH (BG) Matthew A. Zimmerman Jr.		Baptist	October 1, 1989	August 26, 1990
19.	CH (BG) Donald W. Shea		Roman Catholic	November 1, 1990	August 31, 1994
20.	CH (BG) Gaylord T. Gunhus		Lutheran	November 1, 1994	June 2, 1999
21.	CH (BG) David H. Hicks		Presbyterian (USA)	July 1, 1999	April 13, 2003
22.	CH (BG) Jerome A. Haberek		Roman Catholic	April 14, 2003	September 26, 2005
23.	CH (BG) Douglas L. Carver		Southern Baptist	September 27, 2005	July 11, 2007
24.	CH (BG) Donald L. Rutherford		Roman Catholic	November 16, 2007	July 22, 2011
25.	CH (BG) Charles R. Bailey		United Methodist	July 28, 2011	July 31, 2015
26.	CH (BG) Thomas L. Solhjem		Assembly of God	July 31, 2015	May 30, 2019
27.	CH (BG) William Green Jr.		National Baptist Convention	August 16, 2019	December 5, 2023
28.	CH (BG) Jack Stumme		Liberty Baptist Fellowship	December 5, 2023	March 2026
29.	CH (COL) Richard W. West		Anglican Church in North America	March 23, 2026	June 1, 2026
30.	CH (BG) Jack Stumme		Liberty Baptist Fellowship	June 2, 2026	Incumbent

== See also ==
- Chiefs of Chaplains of the United States
- International Military Chiefs of Chaplains Conference
