= Patrick J. Ryan (chaplain) =

United States Army general (1902–1978)

The Reverend Monsignor Patrick J. Ryan OBE OCI
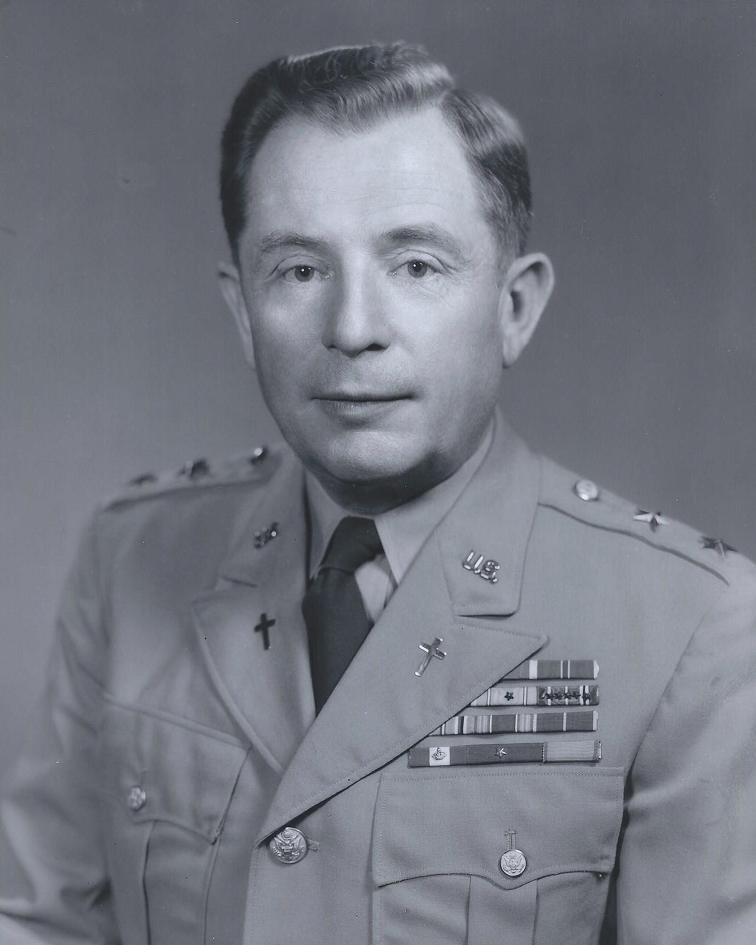
- Portrait of Chaplain Major General Ryan, c. 1956
- Born: Patrick James Ryan; 3 December 1902; Manannah, Minnesota, U.S.
- Died: 5 June 1978 (aged 75); Washington, D.C., U.S.
- Burial place: Calvary Cemetery, Litchfield, Minnesota
- Alma mater: College of St. Thomas (BA); Saint Paul Seminary (STB)
- Military career
- Allegiance: United States
- Branch: United States Army
- Service years: 1928–1958
- Rank: Major general
- Service number: 0-17363
- Commands: U.S. Army Chaplain Corps (CCH)
- Conflicts: World War II; Korean War
- Awards: Distinguished Service Medal; Legion of Merit; Bronze Star Medal; Officer of the Order of the British Empire; Order of the Crown of Italy
- Church: Catholic (Latin Church)

Orders
- Ordination: 1927 (priesthood) by Austin Dowling
- Rank: Domestic prelate (1947); Protonotary apostolic (1967)

Patrick James Ryan (3 December 1902 – 5 June 1978) was an American major general and Catholic priest who served as the 9th Chief of Chaplains of the United States Army from 1954 to 1958. Only briefly serving in a parish after his ordination for the Archdiocese of Saint Paul in 1927, he entered the Army Reserve as a chaplain in 1928. During World War II he served in North Africa and Italy where he earned numerous honors and awards, including appointment as an Officer of the Order of the British Empire. After the war, he held various roles at the Pentagon and at the Sixth Army in San Francisco before becoming Chief of Chaplains in 1954. At the time of his appointment he was the youngest man to have held the role, at 51 years old.

== Early life and education ==
Ryan was born in Manannah Township, Minnesota, near Litchfield, on 3 December 1902. He attended high school at Saint Thomas Military Academy, graduating in 1919. He graduated from the College of St. Thomas and the Saint Paul Seminary and became an ordained Roman Catholic priest for the Archdiocese of Saint Paul in 1927. He served briefly as a parish priest at St. Helena's in Minneapolis before entering the military as a chaplain.

== Military career ==
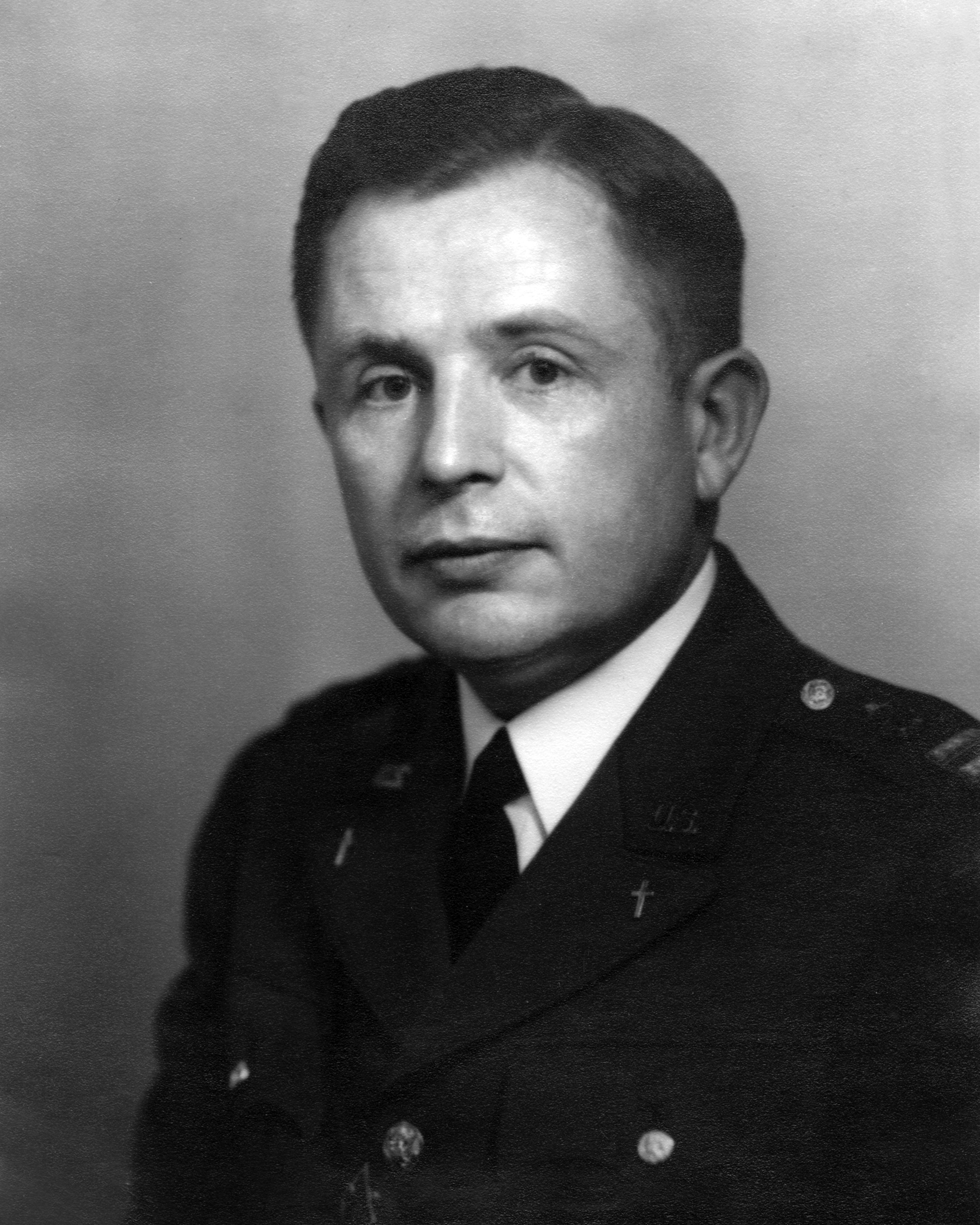
Chaplain Captain Ryan, c. 1937

Ryan joined the United States Army Reserve and was commissioned as a first lieutenant in April 1928. As a reservist, he was first assigned to Fort Snelling. In December 1928, he was assigned to Fort Leavenworth until February 1929, when he was assigned to Fort Riley. In 1932, he was assigned to Fort Shafter as chaplain to the 64th Coast Artillery. In August 1935, he was assigned as the chaplain of Walter Reed Hospital where he remained until October 1939 when he returned to Fort Shafter and Fort Kamehameha. He also assisted in organizing the first Army chaplain corps in Brazil.

=== World War II ===
In November 1941, Ryan was assigned as the chaplain of the 3rd Infantry Division. He was deployed to North Africa, landing on 8 November 1942, as part of Operation Torch. In the spring of 1943, Ryan was reassigned to the Fifth Army and served in Morocco, Sicily, and Italy. He participated in the Operation Avalanche landings at Salerno. On Christmas Eve, 1943, he was promoted to the rank of colonel. After participating in the liberation of Rome in June 1944, Ryan celebrated a Mass of Thanksgiving attended by 10,000 people at the Basilica of St. Mary of the Angels, with Cardinal Eugène Tisserant, secretary of the Sacred Oriental Congregation, presiding. (Note: While current liturgical vernacular commonly uses the terms "celebrating" and "presiding" interchangeably, "presiding" may be used in a more technical sense wherein a prelate attends the Mass in choro and is not the one offering the Mass.) Along with other military officials, he was received in audience by Pope Pius XII on 7 June 1944. Ryan prepared altars and coordinated with German priests to have Mass offered for the 500,000 German POWs in Italy.

=== Post-war ===
Ryan returned from overseas in July 1945, and began serving in the Pentagon in September as director of plans and training in the office of Chief of Chaplains. During that time, he was named the Deputy Chief of Chaplains of the United States Army in March 1946 and served in that role until September 1948. In June 1947, he was named a monsignor of the rank domestic prelate by Pope Pius XII. From September 1948 to 1952, he was chaplain to the Sixth Army in San Francisco. He was again named deputy chief in 1952, and was made brigadier general in 1953.

=== Chief of Chaplains ===
On 18 March 1954, President Dwight D. Eisenhower nominated Ryan as the 9th Chief of Chaplains with the rank of major general. Ryan was visiting troops in Korea at the time. He was sworn in on 1 May 1954, with the rank of major general. At the age of 51, he was the youngest to ever hold the role.

During his time as Chief of Chaplains, Ryan established a 16-week "postgraduate" course for senior chaplains. He stated that a chaplain must not be "some effete busybody or do-gooder ... nor a religious recluse living in an ivory tower. He is a virile, fully-trained specialist." His tenure as chief of chaplains was reported to have "vastly improved" the chaplaincy corps and "achieved the best approach to an all-around religious program" in the history of the Army. He was called both a "chaplain's chaplain" and a "soldier's soldier". With the size of the army decreasing after the war, Ryan sought to increase chaplain numbers, especially in the United States Army Reserve and National Guard, to maintain higher proportions if the need rose again. He retired as chief of chaplains on 30 October 1958.

== Later years ==
After his retirement from the military, Ryan authored a book published by Random House entitled A Soldier Priest Talks to Youth that covered the topics of smoking, drinking, sex, and other relevant topics for adolescents. He also served as the executive vice president of the Catholic Digest. He served as chaplain of the Military Order of the World Wars and Grand Prior of the Military and Hospitaller Order of Saint Lazarus of Jerusalem. He was made a protonotary apostolic by Pope Paul VI in 1967 and died on 5 June 1978, in Washington, D.C. He was one of four alumni of the Saint Paul Seminary in St. Paul, Minnesota, to become the Chief of Chaplains of the United States Army, the other three being Francis L. Sampson, Patrick J. Hessian, and Donald W. Shea.

== Awards and decorations ==
Awards Ryan received include the following:

Distinguished Service Medal
Legion of Merit
Bronze Star Medal
Army Commendation Medal
American Defense Service Medal (with one bronze service star)
European-African-Middle Eastern Campaign Medal (with arrowhead device and five campaign stars)
American Campaign Medal
World War II Victory Medal
National Defense Service Medal
Officer of the Order of the British Empire
Order of the Crown of Italy

== Dates of rank ==
Ryan's dates of rank were:

Insignia	Rank	Component	Date
	First lieutenant	Officers Reserve Corps	27 April 1928
	First lieutenant	Regular Army	2 November 1928
	Captain	Regular Army	5 October 1933
	Major	Regular Army	6 October 1940
	Lieutenant colonel (temporary)	Army of the United States	1 February 1942
	Colonel (temporary)	Army of the United States	24 December 1943
	Lieutenant colonel	Regular Army	27 June 1946
	Colonel	Regular Army	11 March 1948
	Brigadier general (temporary)	Regular Army	6 March 1953
	Major general (temporary)	Regular Army	1 May 1954

== Notes ==
Military offices
Preceded by William D. Cleary	Deputy Chief of Chaplains of the United States Army; 1946–1948	Succeeded by James H. O'Neill
Preceded by James H. O'Neill	Deputy Chief of Chaplains of the United States Army; 1952–1954	Succeeded by Frank A. Tobey
Preceded by Ivan L. Bennett	Chief of Chaplains of the United States Army; 1954–1958	Succeeded by Frank A. Tobey
