= Donald W. Shea =

United States Army general (1936–2016)

The Reverend Monsignor Donald W. Shea
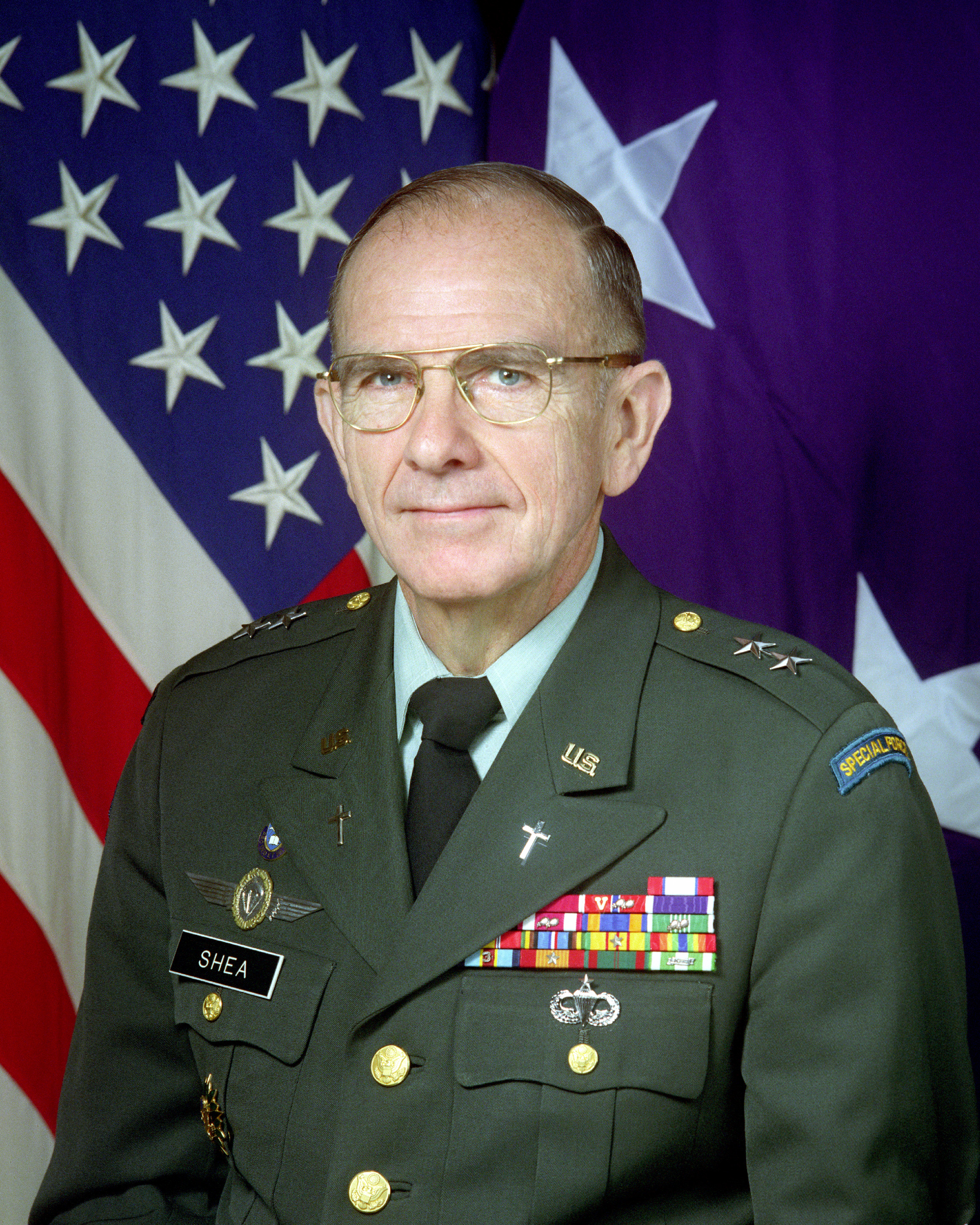
- Official portrait of CH (MG) Shea, 1994
- Born: Donald William Shea; April 15, 1936; Butte, Montana, U.S.
- Died: May 18, 2016 (aged 80); Kalispell, Montana, U.S.
- Education: Carroll College; Saint Paul Seminary; U.S. Army War College; University of Oklahoma; Long Island University; Central Michigan University
- Military career
- Allegiance: United States
- Branch: United States Army
- Service years: 1966–1999
- Rank: Major general
- Commands: U.S. Army Chaplain Corps (CCH)
- Conflicts: Vietnam War
- Awards: Distinguished Service Medal; Legion of Merit; Bronze Star Medal (3)
- Church: Catholic (Latin Church)

Orders
- Ordination: June 2, 1962
- Rank: Protonotary apostolic (2002)

Donald William Shea (April 15, 1936 – May 18, 2016) was an American Army officer and Catholic priest who served as the 19th Chief of Chaplains of the United States Army from 1994 to 1999.

Shea went to seminary at the Saint Paul Seminary in St. Paul, MN. Ordained a priest for the Roman Catholic Diocese of Helena in 1962, Brigadier General Shea was granted the honorary title of monsignor by Pope John Paul II in 1991. He was designated a protonotary apostolic supernumerary in 2002 after his military retirement and return to Montana in 1999. He is one of four alumni of the Saint Paul Seminary in St. Paul, MN to become the Chief of Chaplains of the United States Army, the other three being Patrick J. Ryan, Francis L. Sampson, and Patrick J. Hessian.

== Awards and decorations ==
Distinguished Service Medal
Legion of Merit
Bronze Star (with valor device and two bronze oak leaf clusters)
Purple Heart
Meritorious Service Medal (with two bronze oak leaf clusters)
Air Medal
Army Commendation Medal (with 2 bronze oak leaf clusters)
National Defense Service Medal (with one bronze service star)
Vietnam Service Medal (with one silver service star)
Armed Forces Expeditionary Medal
Army Service Ribbon
Overseas Service Ribbon (with award numeral 3)
Vietnam Gallantry Cross
Vietnam Civil Actions Medal, First Class
Vietnam Campaign Medal

== Gallery ==
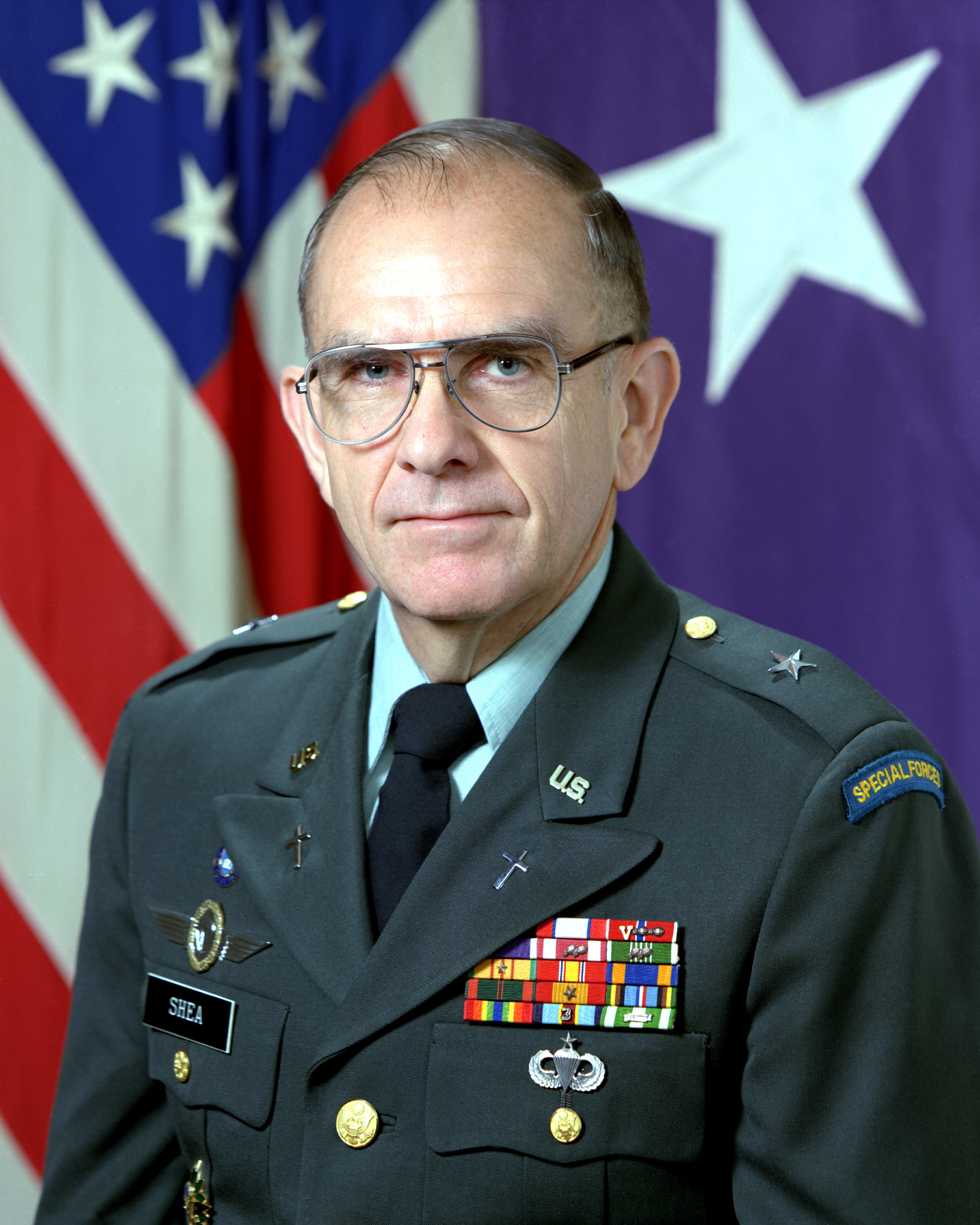
Brig. Gen. Shea in 1991

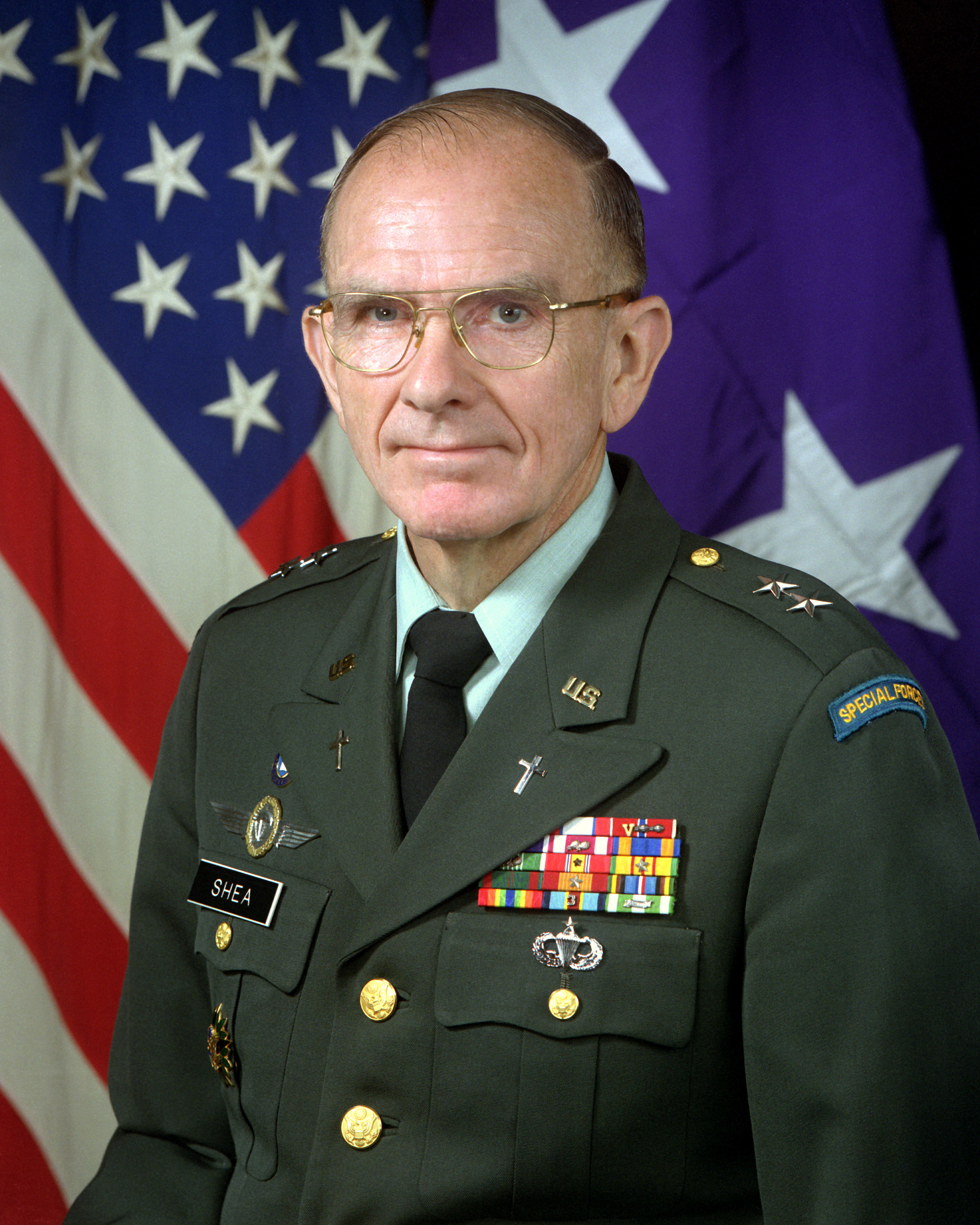
Maj. Gen. Shea in 1994

Military offices
Preceded by Matthew A. Zimmerman	Deputy Chief of Chaplains of the United States Army; 1990–1994	Succeeded by Gaylord T. Gunhus
Preceded by Matthew A. Zimmerman	Chief of Chaplains of the United States Army; 1994–1999	Succeeded by Gaylord T. Gunhus
