= Roy H. Parker =

United States Army general

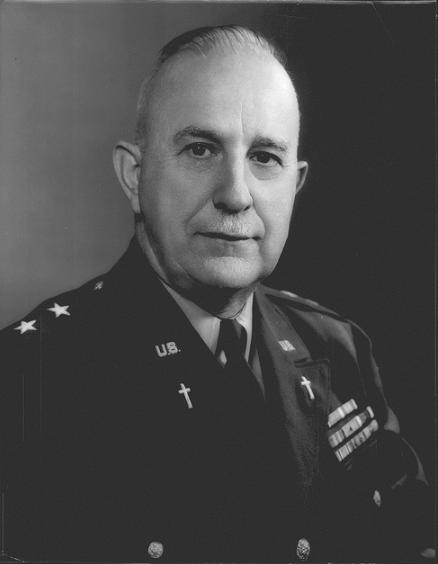
- Major General Roy H. Parker; 7th Chief of Chaplains of the United States Army
- Born: May 15, 1890
- Died: January 15, 1970 (aged 79)
- Burial place: Arlington National Cemetery; Arlington, Virginia
- Spouse: Brazilia Ginsburg Parker
- Military career
- Allegiance: United States
- Branch: United States Army
- Service years: 1918–1952
- Rank: Major General
- Commands: U.S. Army Chaplain Corps
- Conflicts: World War I World War II; Korean War
- Awards: Legion of Merit

Chaplain (Major General) Roy H. Parker (May 15, 1890 – January 15, 1970) was an American Army officer who served as the 7th Chief of Chaplains of the United States Army from 1949 to 1952.

Military offices
| Preceded by Luther D. Miller | Chief of Chaplains of the United States Army; 1949–1952 | Succeeded by Ivan L. Bennett |
