= Luther D. Miller =

United States Army general

Luther Deck Miller
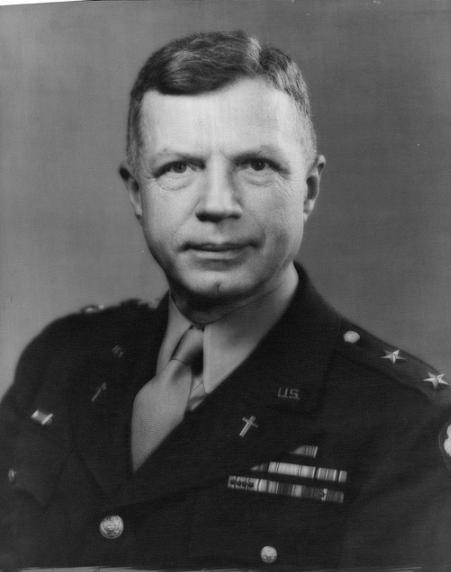
- Major General Luther Deck Miller; 6th Chief of Chaplains of the United States Army
- Born: June 14, 1890; Leechburg, Pennsylvania
- Died: April 27, 1972 (aged 81); Washington, D.C.
- Burial place: Arlington National Cemetery; Arlington, Virginia
- Military career
- Allegiance: United States
- Branch: United States Army
- Service years: 1918–1949
- Rank: Major General
- Commands: U.S. Army Chaplain Corps
- Conflicts: World War I World War II
- Awards: Distinguished Service Medal; Legion of Merit

Chaplain (Major General) Luther Deck Miller (June 14, 1890 – April 27, 1972) was an American Army officer who served as the 6th Chief of Chaplains of the United States Army from 1945 to 1949.

Military offices
Preceded by William R. Arnold	Chief of Chaplains of the United States Army; 1945–1949	Succeeded by Roy H. Parker
