= Ivan L. Bennett =

United States Army general

The Reverend Ivan L. Bennett
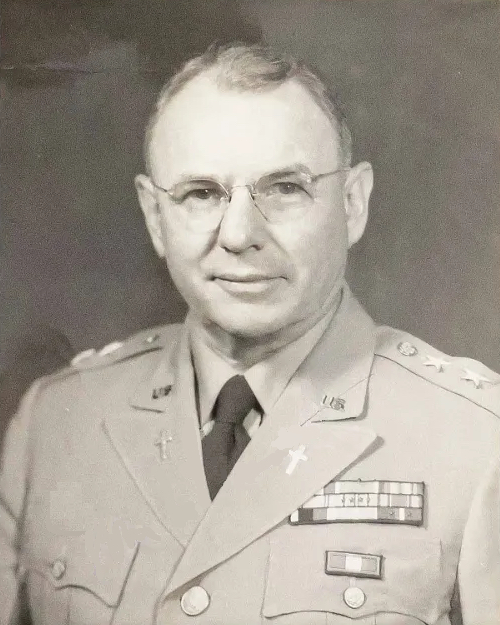
- Portrait of CH (MG) Bennett, c. 1953
- Born: Ivan Loveridge Bennett; April 18, 1892; North Carolina, U.S.
- Died: June 15, 1980 (aged 88); Arlington, Virginia, U.S.
- Burial place: Arlington National Cemetery
- Education: Wake Forest College; LaSalle Extension University
- Spouse: Ruby Jenrette
- Children: 3, including Ivan Jr. and John
- Military career
- Branch: United States Army
- Service years: 1918–1954
- Rank: Major general
- Commands: U.S. Army Chaplain Corps (CCH)
- Conflicts: World War I; World War II; Korean War
- Awards: Distinguished Service Medal; Legion of Merit
- Church: Southern Baptist Convention

Orders
- Ordination: 1914

Ivan Loveridge Bennett (April 18, 1892 – June 15, 1980) was an American military chaplain who served as Chief of Chaplains of the United States Army from 1952 to 1954.

Military offices
Preceded by Roy H. Parker	Chief of Chaplains of the United States Army; 1952–1954	Succeeded by Patrick J. Ryan
