= Axton =

Axton may refer to:

- Axton, Virginia, an unincorporated community in the United States
- Axton, an alternative spelling for Axstane, the Hundred in Kent
- Axton (surname)
- Axton (character), the name of a Borderlands 2 character
