= Einertson =

Einertson is a surname. Notable people with the surname include:

- Darrell Einertson (born 1972), American baseball player
- Norris L. Einertson (born 1930), United States Army general
