= Orris E. Kelly =

United States Army general (1926–2026)

Orris Eugene Kelly
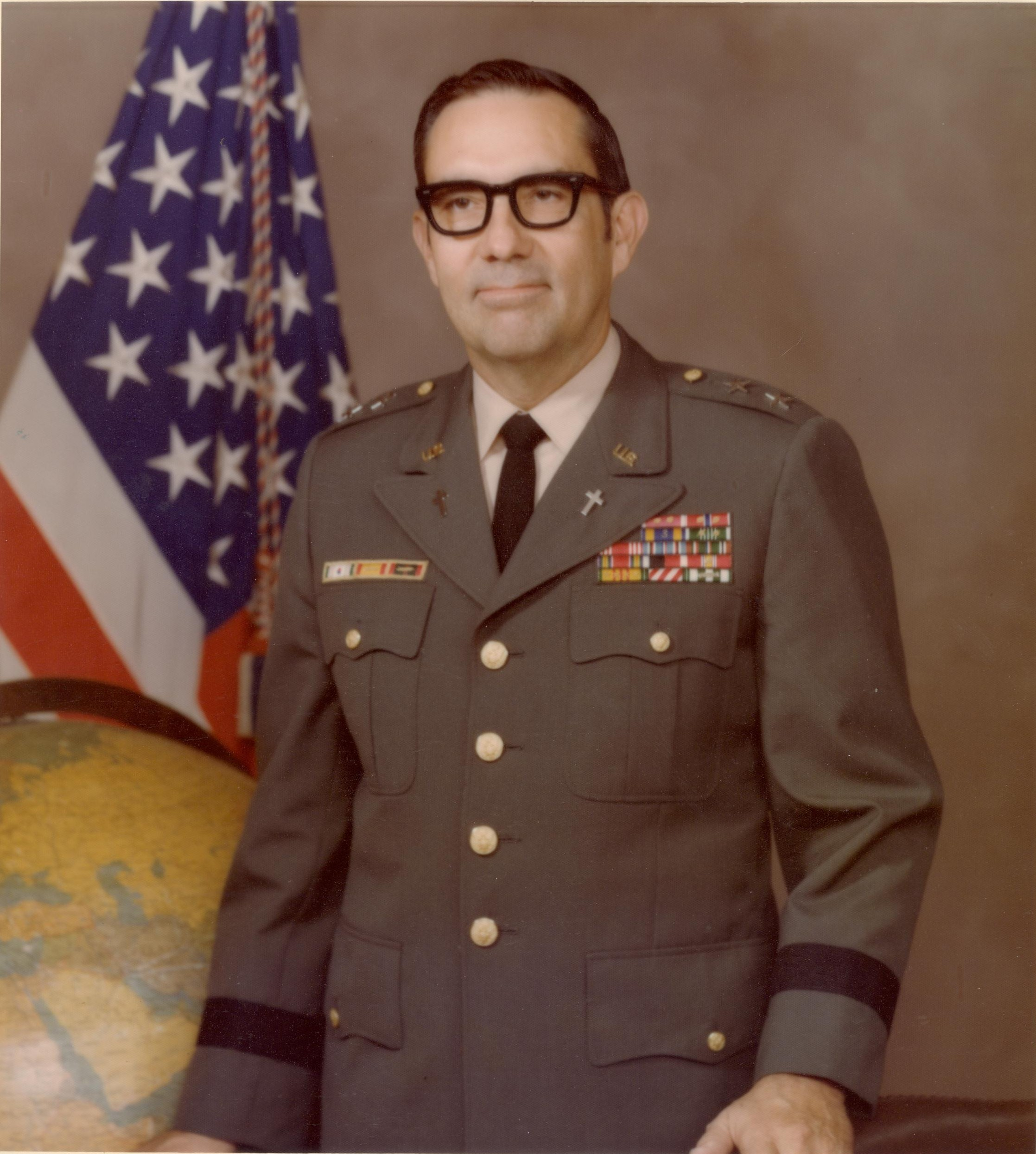
- Kelly in the 1970s
- Born: July 28, 1926; Montrose, Kansas, U.S.
- Died: July 31, 2026 (aged 100); Manhattan, Kansas, U.S.
- Military career
- Allegiance: United States of America
- Branch: United States Army
- Service years: 1944–1946; 1953–1979
- Rank: Major General
- Units: 53rd Infantry Regiment; 104th Infantry Division; 1st Armored Division; 398th Engineer Construction Battalion; 8th Cavalry Regiment; 1st Infantry Division; 7th Infantry Division; 4th Infantry Division
- Commands: U.S. Army Chaplain Corps
- Conflicts: World War II; Korean War; Vietnam War
- Awards: Distinguished Service Medal; Legion of Merit; Bronze Star

Chaplain (Major General) Orris Eugene Kelly (July 28, 1926 – July 31, 2026) was an American Army officer who served as the 14th Chief of Chaplains of the United States Army from 1975 to 1979.

== Early life ==
Kelly was born in Montrose, Kansas, on July 28, 1926, to Herman Albertis (H.A.) "Bert" Kelly and Theodora Viola Pacak, the daughter of Czech immigrants from the Austro-Hungarian Empire.

He attended elementary and high school in Montrose.

== World War II ==
In January 1944, he entered the Army Specialized Training Program to attend the University of Kansas, where he hoped to become a civil engineer. In August 1944, he was sent to basic training at Camp Fannin, Texas, and then to Officer Candidate School at Fort Benning, Georgia. He was commissioned a second lieutenant, Infantry, Class 452, on May 29, 1945.

Kelly served at Camp Shelby, Mississippi; Fort Hood, Texas; Camp Callan, California; Camp San Luis Obispo, California; and in the Army of Occupation in Germany. His experiences in the ruins of Dresden as an officer in the military police made him change his goal of becoming an engineer into becoming a chaplain. He left the service in 1946 as a first lieutenant to resume college.

== Interwar years ==
Kelly completed his AB degree at Kansas Wesleyan University, Salina, Kansas, in 1950 and graduated with a Bachelor of Divinity degree from the Garrett Theological Seminary (Northwestern University), Evanston, Illinois, in 1953. He was ordained as a Methodist clergyman in June 1953.

== Second military tour ==
Immediately after ordination, he entered on active duty at Fort Leonard Wood, Missouri. He served with the 398th Engineer Construction Battalion as housing area pastor during his first year. In 1954, he was assigned to the 8th Cavalry Regiment of the First Cavalry Division in Japan for three years, where he adopted two Japanese orphans along with his wife Phyllis Goodenow-Kelly. After returning to the United States, Reverend Kelly was stationed at Fort Riley, Kansas, from 1957 to 1961. During this period, he attended the Associate Command and General Staff College, graduating in 1959. In 1961, he was assigned to an overseas replacement battle group and transferred to the Seventh Infantry Division in Korea

From 1962 to 1966, he served on the staff of the US Army Chaplain School, Fort Hamilton, New York. During the period from 1966 to 1969, he was assigned as Director, U.S. Forces Religious Retreat Center, Berchtesgaden, Germany. In 1969, he was transferred to Vietnam in July to serve as Division Chaplain of the Fourth Infantry Division at Pleiku and An Khe. Kelly joined the staff of the Office Chief of Chaplains in 1970, serving first as an action officer in Plans, Programs and Policies Directorate, and later as Director.

In 1972, he was selected to attend the Army War College, the highest level of military education in the Department of the Army. Concurrent with his studies at the War College, he received a Master of Science degree in Counseling from Shippensburg State College, Shippensburg, Pennsylvania.

Returning to Washington in 1973, he was assigned to the Office of the Chief of Chaplains as Executive Officer, a position he held until July 31, 1975.

On April 7, 1975, Kelly was nominated by President Ford for the appointment as Chief of Chaplains, Department of the Army, with promotion from lieutenant colonel to major general. The Senate confirmed the nomination on April 29, 1975, and promotion ceremonies were conducted on August 1, 1975, by General Walter T. Kerwin, Jr., Vice Chief of Staff of the United States Army.

Kelly retired from the Army on July 1, 1979.

== Post-army life ==
On August 1, 1979, he assumed the position of Associate General Secretary for the Division of Chaplains and Related Ministries (DCRM). This is an organization part of the Board of Higher Education and Ministry of the United Methodist Church. During his association with DCRM, he became acquainted with the President of the Hospital Corporation of America, who asked him to become the Vice President of Pastoral Service with the responsibility for developing pastoral care programs in the 480 hospital HCA system. He assumed this position in 1985.

Kelly turned 100 on July 28, 2026, and died three days later on July 31.

== Awards and decorations ==
Distinguished Service Medal
Legion of Merit (with two bronze oak leaf clusters)
Bronze Star (with two bronze oak leaf clusters)
Air Medal (with three bronze oak leaf clusters)
Army Commendation Medal (with three bronze oak leaf clusters)
Army Good Conduct Medal
Army Meritorious Unit Commendation
Republic of Korea Presidential Unit Citation
American Campaign Medal
European-African-Middle Eastern Campaign Medal
World War II Victory Medal
Army of Occupation Medal
National Defense Service Medal (with one bronze service star)
Vietnam Service Medal (with four bronze service stars)
Republic of Vietnam Civil Action Honor Medal
Vietnamese Cross of Gallantry
Vietnam Staff Service Medal
Vietnam Campaign Medal

Military offices
Preceded by Gerhardt W. Hyatt	Chief of Chaplains of the United States Army; 1975–1979	Succeeded by Kermit D. Johnson
