= Patrick J. Hessian =

American general and priest (1928–2007)

The Reverend Monsignor Patrick J. Hessian
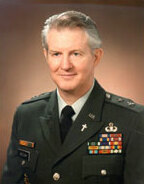
- Portrait of Hessian in uniform, c. 1982
- Born: 20 May 1928; Belle Plaine, Minnesota, U.S.
- Died: 8 September 2007 (aged 79); Edina, Minnesota, U.S.
- Burial place: Sacred Heart Catholic Cemetery, Belle Plaine, Minnesota, U.S.
- Military career
- Allegiance: United States
- Branch: United States Army
- Service years: 1958–1986
- Rank: Major General
- Units: 1st Brigade, 1st Armored Division; Eighth Army Support Command; 8th Infantry Division; 173rd Airborne Brigade; 101st Airborne Division; XVIII Airborne Corps; Seventh Army
- Commands: U.S. Army Chaplain Corps
- Conflicts: Vietnam War
- Awards: Soldier's Medal; Bronze Star; Purple Heart
- Church: Catholic (Latin Church)

Orders
- Ordination: 1953 (priesthood) by John Gregory Murray
- Rank: Prelate of Honour of His Holiness (1983)

Patrick John Hessian (20 May 1928 – 8 September 2007) was an American major general and Catholic priest who served as the 16th Chief of Chaplains of the United States Army from 1982 to 1986.

An alumnus of Saint Paul Seminary, Hessian was ordained for the Archdiocese of Saint Paul in 1953, then served in a St. Paul parish for a decade before entering full-time Army chaplaincy. During his service as a chaplain, he received the Purple Heart after being wounded by shrapnel in Vietnam and the Soldier's Medal for disarming a suicidal soldier who was holding a grenade.

He became the 16th Chief of Chaplains of the United States Army in 1982 and served in that role until 1986. His time as Chief of Chaplains was marked by a focus on increasing the spirituality and spiritual well-being of chaplains, as well as a court battle questioning the legality of the chaplain corps.

== Early life ==
Hessian was from the city of Belle Plaine, Minnesota, born to Emmit and Oleta Hessian on 20 May 1928. After attending Nazareth Hall Preparatory Seminary and Saint Paul Seminary, Hessian was ordained for the Archdiocese of Saint Paul on 30 May 1953. For a decade, he served at St. James Parish in the West Seventh, St. Paul, first as vicar and then as administrator. He occasionally drove around in a Model T, breaking up fights between neighborhood children.

== Military career ==
Hessian entered the United States Army Reserve in 1958 as a 1st Lieutenant. He entered active duty on 29 August 1963, as a member of the 1st Brigade, 1st Armored Division. He was transferred in October 1964 to the Eighth Army Support Command in Korea. In December 1965, he was assigned to Germany; while there, he participated in NATO exercises in Greece and Turkey. He became the deputy division chaplain for the 8th Infantry Division in January 1966. During that time, he went through airborne training. He did not enjoy jumping out of airplanes, but nevertheless considered the training to be important for him to complete. In July 1969, he became the chaplain for the 173rd Airborne Brigade in Vietnam. While in Vietnam he was near-fatally hit by shrapnel, for which he earned the Purple Heart. He earned the Soldier's Medal for disarming a suicidal soldier who was holding a live grenade with the pin pulled. Qualified for both amphibious and airborne operations, Hessian had a unique skillset among chaplains.

From 1970 to 1971, he attended the Army Chaplain School at Fort Hamilton in New York; following that, he became the chaplain at Fort Leonard Wood. From 1973 to 1974, he attended the United States Army Command and General Staff College at Fort Leavenworth, Kansas, and also received a Master of Arts degree in communications and human relations from the University of Kansas. From January to August 1975, he was the staff chaplain for the 101st Airborne Division and Fort Campbell. In September 1975, he was assigned as the chaplain for Fort Bragg and the XVIII Airborne Corps. After attending the senior service college at the United States Army War College from 1977 to 1978, he was assigned as the chaplain for the Seventh Army and US Army Europe.

In 1979, Hessian was promoted to brigadier general and was nominated by Ronald Reagan as the deputy chief of chaplains. While deputy, Hessian assisted in creating a video tape including topics such as the need for collegiality among chaplains, the shortage of Catholic chaplains, and making chaplains more visible to soldiers.

=== Chief of Chaplains ===
On 24 June 1982, he was promoted to major general and nominated as the 16th Chief of Chaplains of the United States Army, for which he was confirmed on 30 June 1982, effective the following day. On 7 January 1983, the Army announced that Pope John Paul II had made Hessian a monsignor, with the rank Prelate of Honour of His Holiness.

During his time as Chief of Chaplains, one of Hessian's primary focuses was the spirituality and spiritual well-being of chaplains. He also desired to enhance chaplain training, which he considered itself to be part of the ministry of chaplains – his motto was "Training is ministry". He sought to recruit more chaplains from underrepresented groups, such as Catholics, women, and minorities. Under his tenure, the program for training seminarians was renamed to the Chaplain Candidate program. He also pushed to modernize the chaplaincy corps to use up-to-date computer and software systems. When some chaplains who had served in Vietnam expressed hesitancy about chaplains being forbidden from carrying firearms, Hessian defended the prohibition to ensure their status as non-combatants. Hessian inherited the struggle of a 1979 lawsuit from Joel Katcoff and Allen Wieder, law students at the time, claiming that the structure of chaplaincy was unconstitutional. After various rulings and appeals, Katcoff and Wieder sought to drop the suit; Hessian argued that the case should be brought to completion. The case was eventually dismissed with prejudice.

On 18 June 1986, Norris L. Einertson was confirmed by the Senate to succeed Hessian as the 17th Chief of Chaplains. A retirement dinner was held for Hessian on 25 June 1986, at Fort Myer, at which Army Chief of Staff General John A. Wickham Jr. gave a speech calling Hessian's ministry "characterized by a passionate concern for the needs of soldiers."

He is one of four alumni of the Saint Paul Seminary in St. Paul, Minnesota, to become the Chief of Chaplains of the United States Army, the other three being Patrick J. Ryan, Francis L. Sampson, and Donald W. Shea.

== Later life ==
After retiring from the military, Hessian served as the Director of Development for the Archdiocese of Saint Paul and Minneapolis from 1988 to 1991 before retiring from full-time ministry. He died on 8 September 2007, and following a funeral celebrated by Archbishop Flynn and 40 other priests, was buried with military honors in Sacred Heart Cemetery in Belle Plaine, Minnesota.

== Awards and decorations ==
Soldier's Medal
Bronze Star Medal
Purple Heart
Meritorious Service Medal
Air Medal
Army Commendation Medal
Vietnam Gallantry Cross Unit Citation
Vietnam Civil Actions Unit Citation
National Defense Service Medal
Vietnam Service Medal
Armed Forces Reserve Medal
Army Service Ribbon
Overseas Service Ribbon
Vietnam Gallantry Cross
Vietnam Campaign Medal

Military offices
Preceded by Kermit D. Johnson	Deputy Chief of Chaplains of the United States Army; 1979–1982	Succeeded by Paul O. Forsberg
Preceded by Kermit D. Johnson	Chief of Chaplains of the United States Army; 1982–1986	Succeeded by Norris L. Einertson
