= Axton (surname) =

Axton is an English surname. Notable people with this surname include the following:

- David Axton, pen-name of Dean Koontz
- Estelle Axton (1918–2004), American co-founder of Stax Records
- Hoyt Axton (1938–1999), American country music singer-songwriter, and actor.
- John T. Axton (1870–1934), First U.S. Army Chief of Chaplains
- Mae Boren Axton (1914–1997), American songwriter
- Mildred "Micky" Axton (1919–2010), American aviator
- Packy Axton (1941–1974), American R&B saxophonist, son of Estelle Axton
