= Frank A. Tobey =

United States Army general

Frank Alden Tobey
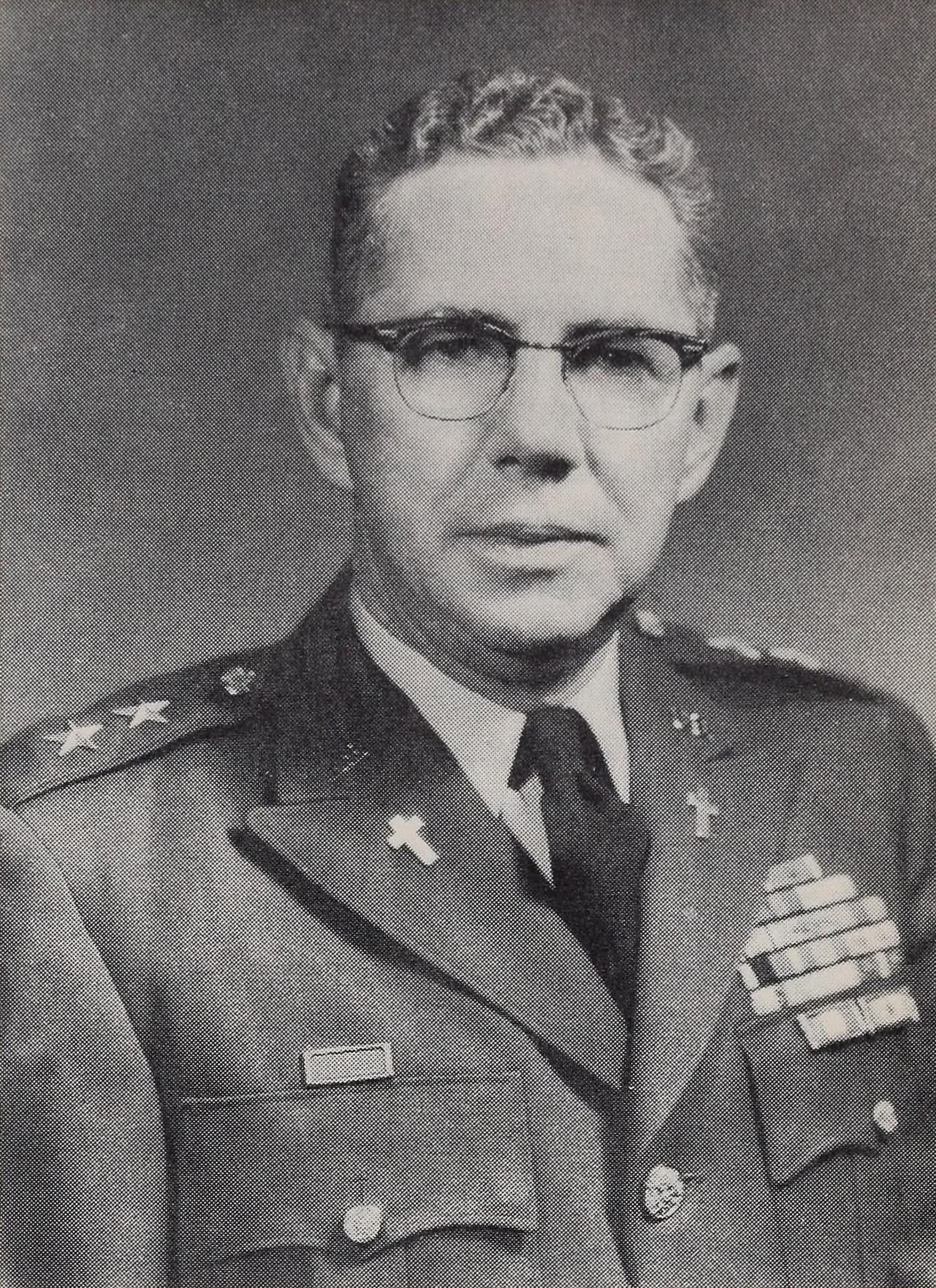
- Born: February 7, 1903; Everett, Massachusetts, U.S.
- Died: December 6, 1977 (aged 74); Fairhope, Alabama, U.S.
- Burial place: Arlington National Cemetery; Arlington, Virginia
- Military career
- Allegiance: United States
- Branch: United States Army
- Service years: 1938–1962
- Rank: Major General
- Commands: U.S. Army Chaplain Corps
- Conflicts: World War II; Korean War
- Awards: Distinguished Service Medal

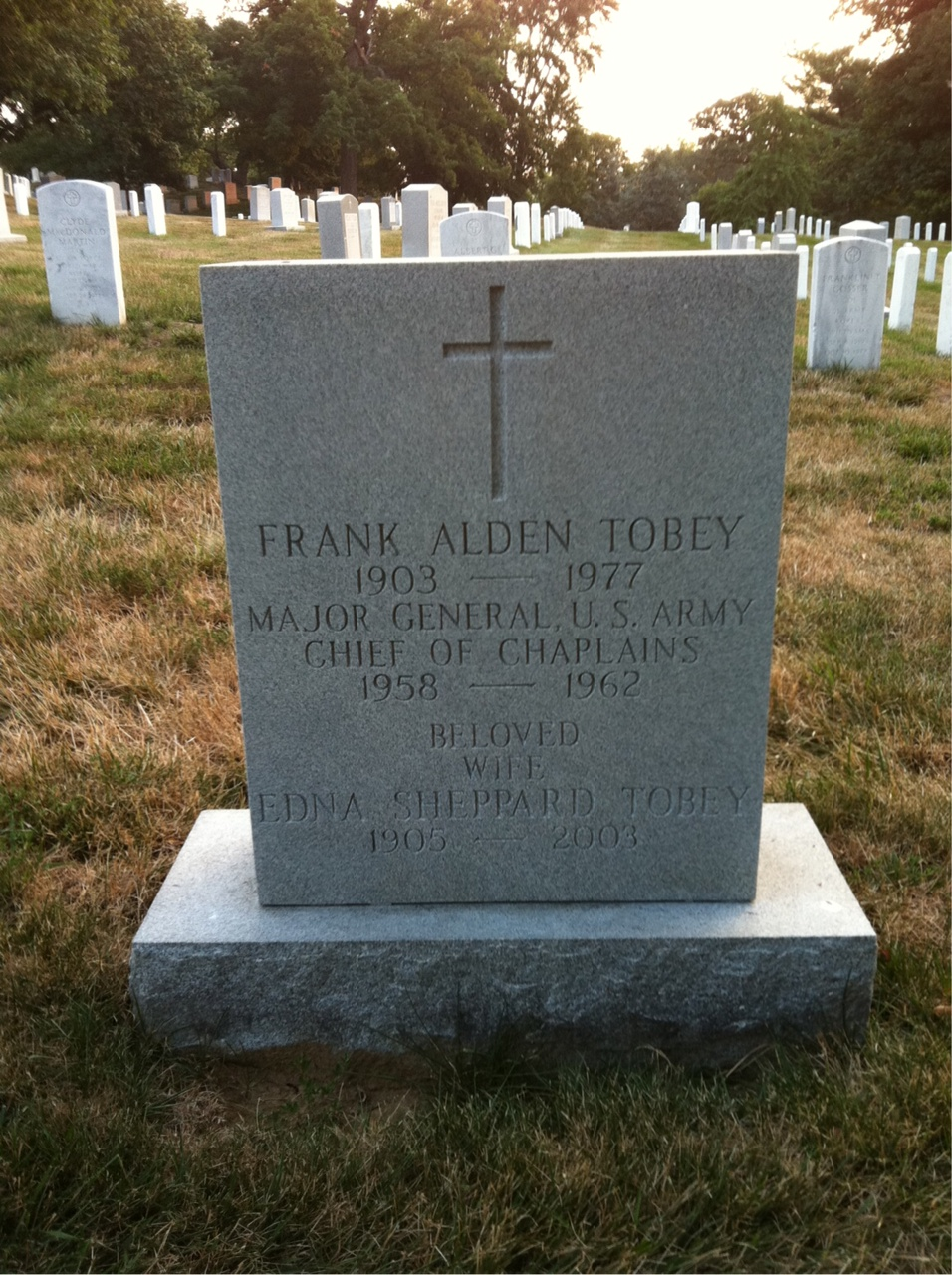
Grave at Arlington National Cemetery

Frank Alden Tobey (February 7, 1903 – December 6, 1977) was an American Army officer who served as the 10th Chief of Chaplains of the United States Army from 1958 to 1962.

Military offices
Preceded by Patrick J. Ryan	Chief of Chaplains of the United States Army; 1958–1962	Succeeded by Charles E. Brown Jr.
