= Norris L. Einertson =

United States Army general

Norris Leonard Einertson
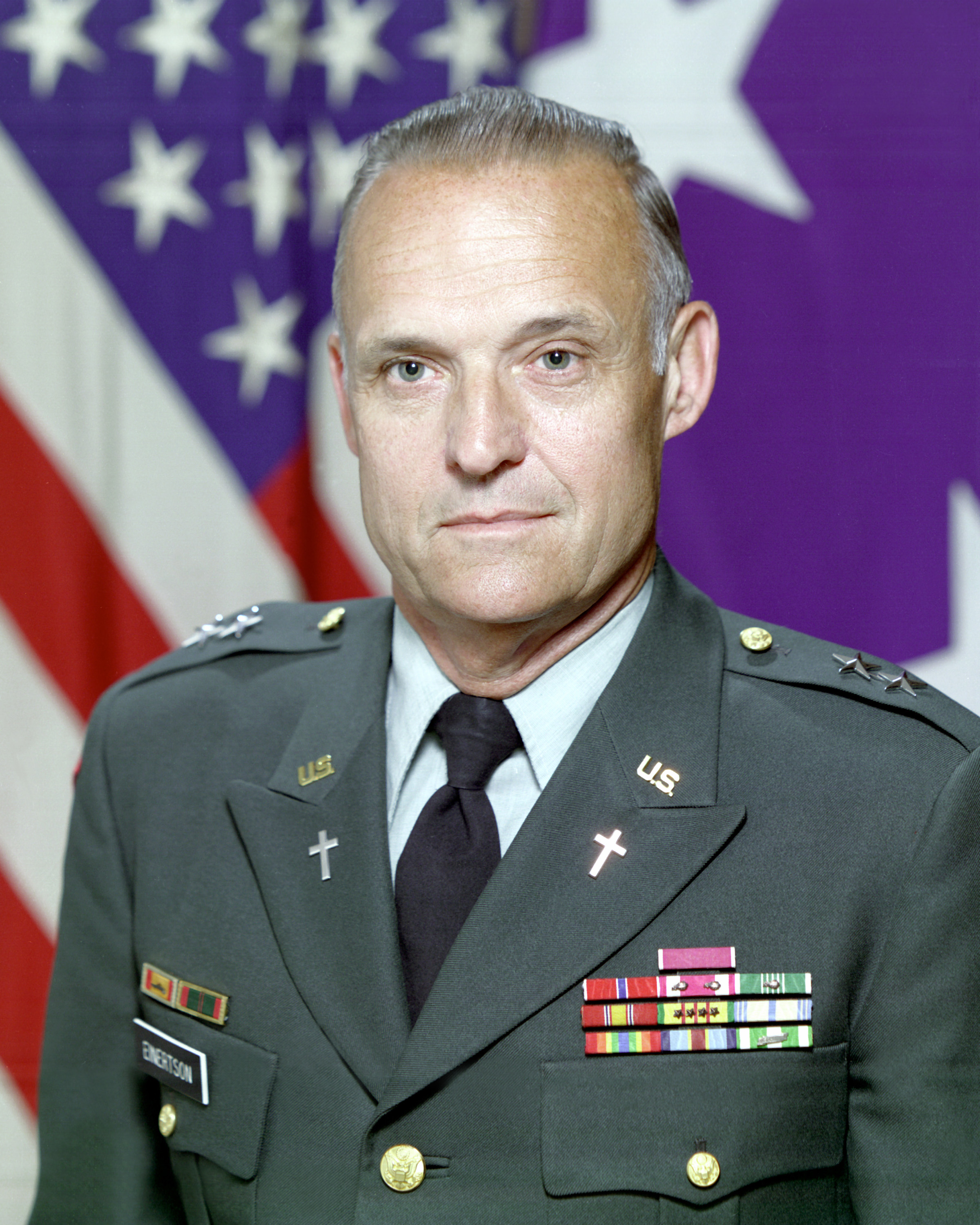
- Major General Norris Leonard Einertson; 17th Chief of Chaplains of the United States Army
- Born: August 6, 1930 (age 96); Westbrook, Minnesota
- Military career
- Allegiance: United States
- Branch: United States Army
- Service years: 1961–1990
- Rank: Major General
- Commands: U.S. Army Chaplain Corps
- Conflicts: Vietnam War
- Awards: Distinguished Service Medal; Legion of Merit; Bronze Star Medal; Meritorious Service Medal

Chaplain (Major General) Norris Leonard Einertson, USA (born August 6, 1930) is a retired American Army officer who served as the 17th Chief of Chaplains of the United States Army from 1986 to 1990. Einertson held degrees from Luther Theological Seminary and New York Theological Seminary. He was endorsed by the Evangelical Lutheran Church in America.

== Awards and decorations ==
Distinguished Service Medal (with one bronze oak leaf cluster)
Legion of Merit
Bronze Star
Meritorious Service Medal (with two bronze oak leaf clusters)
Army Commendation Medal (with one bronze oak leaf cluster)
Vietnam Gallantry Cross Unit Citation
Vietnam Civil Actions Unit Citation
National Defense Service Medal
Vietnam Service Medal (with four bronze service stars)
Armed Forces Reserve Medal
Army Service Ribbon
Overseas Service Ribbon
Vietnam Campaign Medal

Military offices
Preceded by Paul O. Forsberg	Deputy Chief of Chaplains of the United States Army; 1985–1986	Succeeded by Charles J. McDonnell
Preceded by Patrick J. Hessian	Chief of Chaplains of the United States Army; 1986–1990	Succeeded by Matthew A. Zimmerman
