= Matthew A. Zimmerman =

United States Army general (born 1941)

Matthew Augustus Zimmerman Jr.
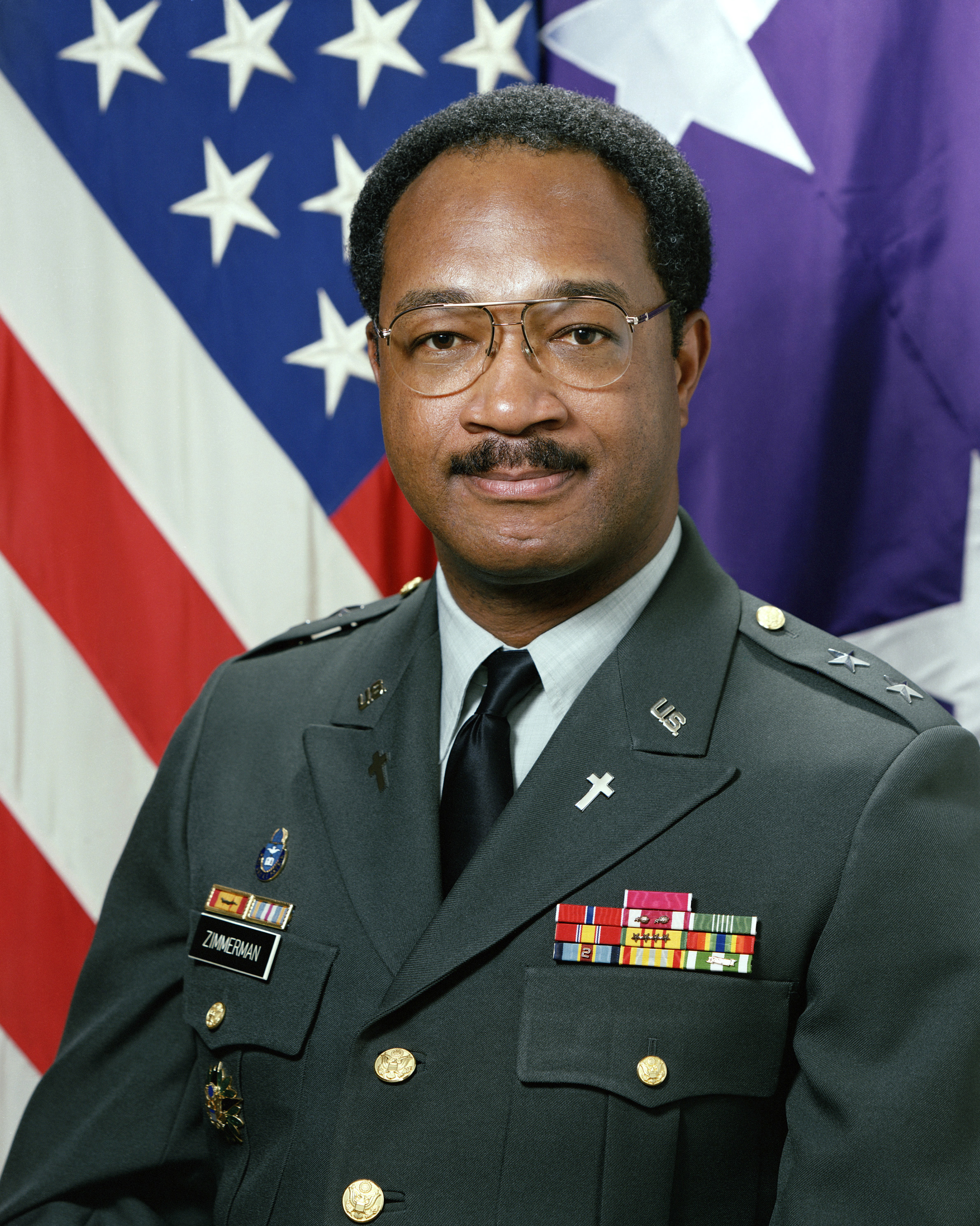
- Major General Matthew Augustus Zimmerman, Jr. 18th Chief of Chaplains of the United States Army
- Born: December 9, 1941 (age 84); Rock Hill, South Carolina
- Military career
- Allegiance: United States of America
- Branch: United States Army
- Service years: 1967–1994
- Rank: Major General
- Commands: U.S. Army Chaplain Corps
- Conflicts: Vietnam War
- Awards: Legion of Merit; Bronze Star; Meritorious Service Medal

Chaplain (Major General) Matthew Augustus Zimmerman Jr., USA (born December 9, 1941) is a retired American Army officer who served as the 18th Chief of Chaplains of the United States Army from 1990 to 1994. He was the first African American to hold this position.

He is a member of Omega Psi Phi fraternity.

== Awards and decorations ==
Legion of Merit
Bronze Star
Meritorious Service Medal (with two bronze oak leaf clusters)
Army Commendation Medal
Vietnam Gallantry Cross Unit Citation
Joint Meritorious Unit Award
National Defense Service Medal
Vietnam Service Medal (with four bronze service stars)
Army Service Ribbon
Overseas Service Ribbon (with award numeral 2)
Vietnam Armed Forces Honor Medal
Vietnam Campaign Medal

Military offices
Preceded by Charles J. McDonnell	Deputy Chief of Chaplains of the United States Army; 1989–1990	Succeeded by Donald W. Shea
Preceded by Norris L. Einertson	Chief of Chaplains of the United States Army; 1990–1994	Succeeded by Donald W. Shea
