= Charles E. Brown Jr. =

United States Army general

Charles Edwin Brown Jr.
- Branch: United States Army

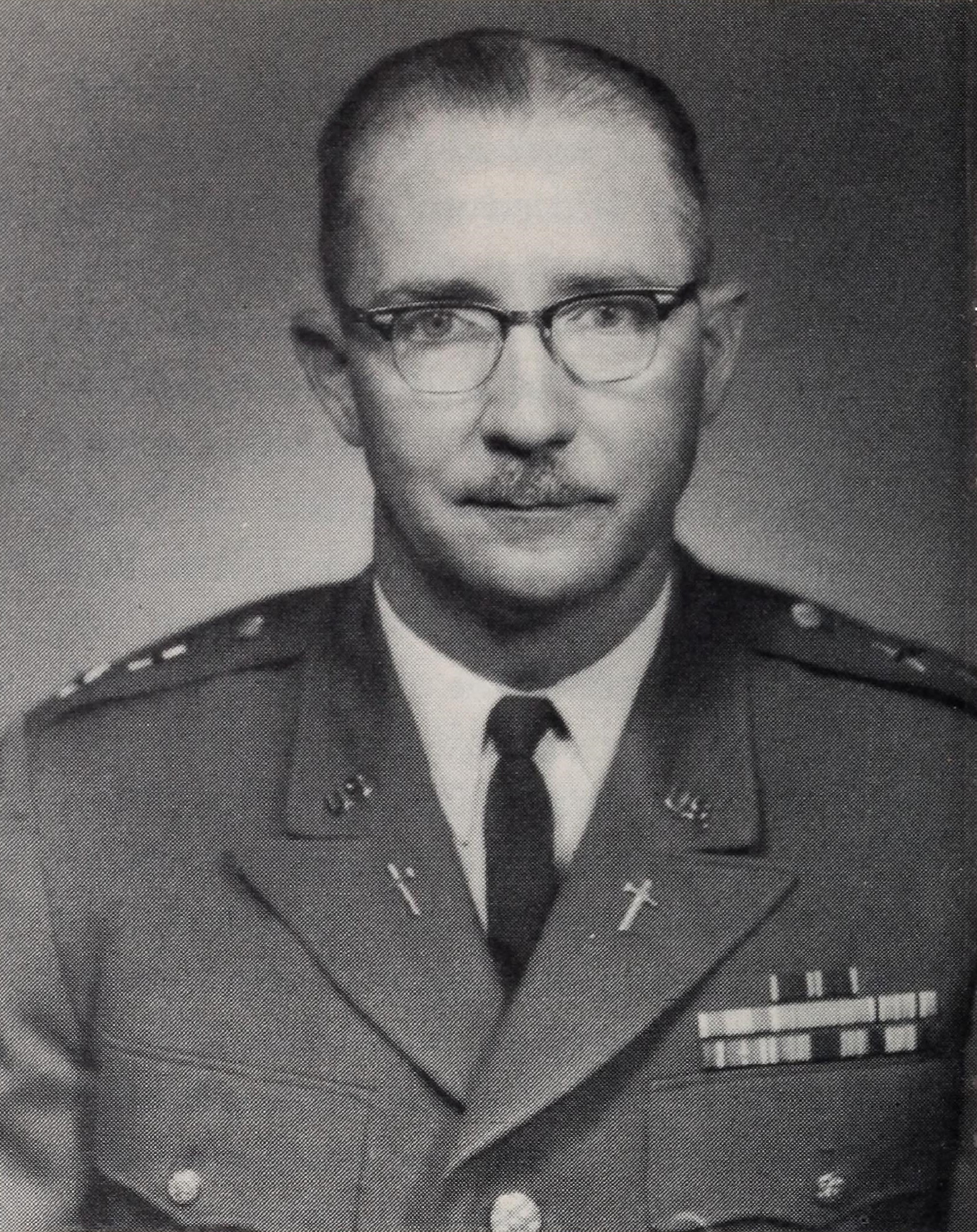
Charles E. Brown Jr.

Charles Edwin Brown Jr. (December 31, 1911 – August 23, 1996) was a major general and Chief of Chaplains of the United States Army.

== Biography ==
Brown graduated from high school in Kiowa, Kansas in 1930. In 1934, he graduated from Southwestern College and married Ava Currier. The following year, he was ordained by the Methodist Episcopal Church.

== Military career ==
During World War II, Brown served with the 3rd Infantry Division of the Fifth Army during the North African Campaign and the Italian Campaign. After the war, he was stationed at Fort Oglethorpe. Later, he attended the United States Army Command and General Staff College and became the first chaplain to attend the United States Army War College.

Brown became Chief of Chaplains on November 1, 1962 after being promoted to major general from colonel, bypassing the rank of brigadier general. He remained in the position until his retirement on July 31, 1967.

Military offices
Preceded by Frank A. Tobey	Chief of Chaplains of the United States Army; 1962 – 1967	Succeeded by Francis L. Sampson
