= Soldiers of God =

Official hymn of the U.S. Army Chaplain Corps

- by: Ben Machan (music); Hy Zaret (lyrics)
- Year: 1944
- Dedication: United States Army Chaplain Corps

Premiere
- Date: 13 February 1944
- Location: The Army Hour

"Soldiers of God"
"Soldiers of God" as sung by the Chaplain Corps, without the introduciton.

"Soldiers of God" is the hymn of the United States Army Chaplain Corps, dating to around 1944.

In a circular letter dated 1 February 1944, Army Chief of Chaplains William Arnold expressed a desire for a hymn for the Chaplain Corps, pointing out that the Air Corps, Signal Corps, artillery, and infantry branches all had their own hymns. "Soldiers of God", composed by Ben Machan and written by Private Hy Zaret, had already been unofficially circulating among the corps. With some tweaks, Arnold designated it as the official hymn of the Chaplain Corps. The hymn was first heard by the public on The Army Hour on 13 February 1944. A more widespread performance was sung by Bing Crosby on the Kraft Music Hall Radio Program on Easter, April 9, 1944.

From World War II until around 2004, the hymn was commonly sung at Chaplain Corps functions. The hymn fell out of use, but since the early 2020s it has been reintroduced into Army programs.
