= Gaylord T. Gunhus =

United States Army general

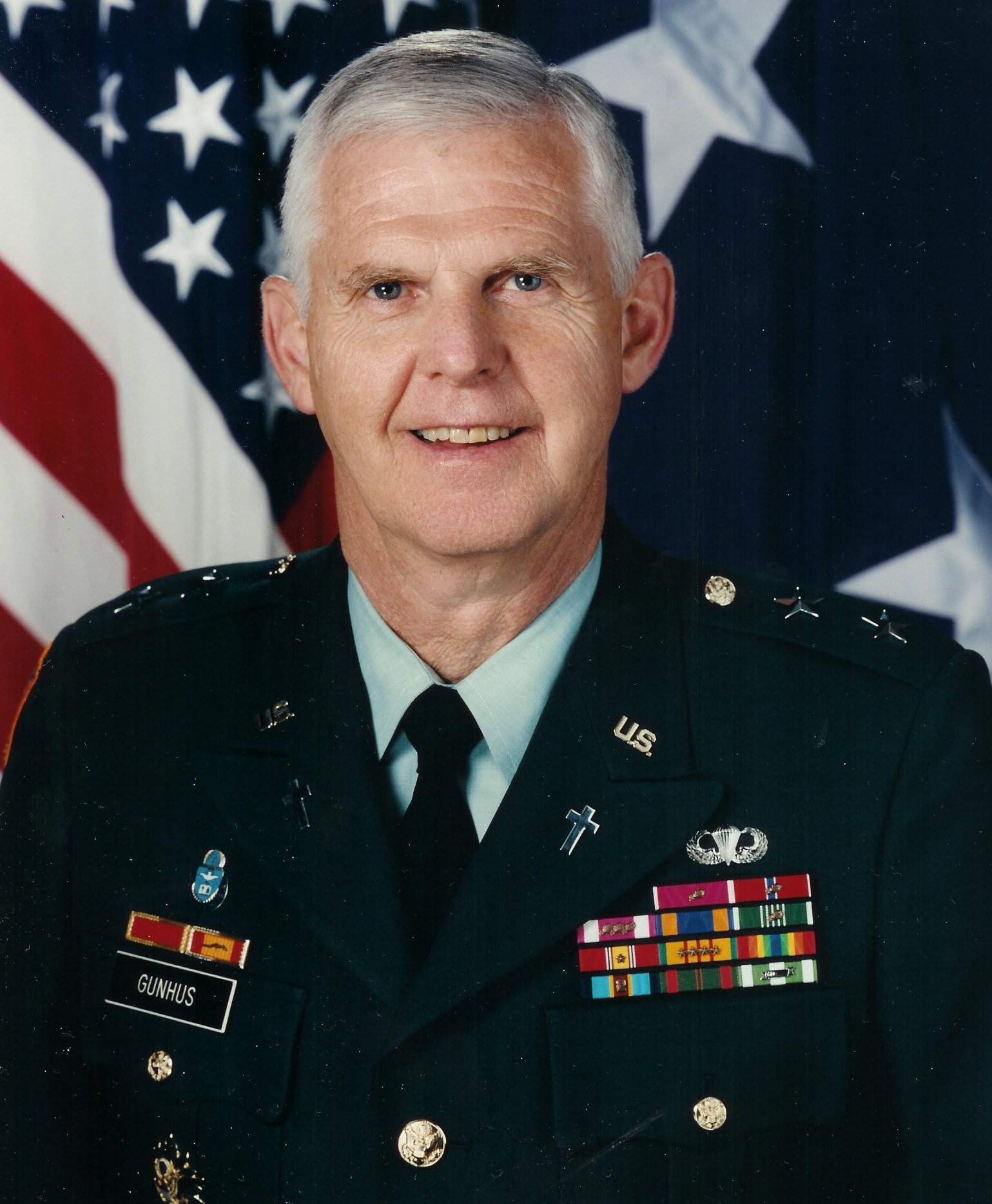
- Major General Gaylord T. Gunhus; 20th Chief of Chaplains of the United States Army
- Born: Gaylord Thomas Gunhus; May 22, 1940; Enderlin, North Dakota, U.S.
- Died: May 27, 2016 (aged 76); Scottsdale, Arizona, U.S.
- Military career
- Allegiance: United States of America
- Branch: United States Army
- Service years: 1966–2003
- Rank: Major General
- Nickname: G.T. Gunhus
- Commands: U.S. Army Chaplain Corps
- Conflicts: Vietnam War; War on terror
- Awards: Legion of Merit; Bronze Star; Meritorious Service Medal

Chaplain (Major General) Gaylord Thomas "G.T." Gunhus (May 22, 1940 – May 27, 2016) was an American Army officer who, from 1999 to 2003, served as the 20th Chief of Chaplains of the United States Army. He is a 1962 graduate of Seattle Pacific University where he was named Alumnus of the Year in the spring of 2001. He later graduated from the Lutheran Brethren Seminary in 1967 with a Masters of Divinity degree.

After seminary, Gunhus served two tours in the Vietnam War. He graduated from the Princeton Theological Seminary in 1976 with a Masters in Theology degree. He continued his way up the ranks during the next three decades before being named Chief of Chaplains of the US Army in 1999 by President Bill Clinton. He was the head chaplain for the army based at the Pentagon prior to, during, and after the 9/11 attacks on the Pentagon. He continued in this role until his retirement in 2003. After retirement, he was the military correspondent for Guideposts magazine. General Gunhus died on May 27, 2016, at the Mayo Clinic in Scottsdale, Arizona.

== Awards and decorations ==
Legion of Merit (with one bronze oak leaf cluster)
Bronze Star Medal (with one bronze oak leaf cluster)
Meritorious Service Medal (with three oak leaf clusters)
Air Medal
Army Commendation Medal (with one oak leaf cluster)
Meritorious Unit Commendation
National Defense Service Medal (with one bronze service star)
Vietnam Service Medal (with four bronze service stars)
Army Service Ribbon
Overseas Service Ribbon (with award numeral 2)
Vietnam Civil Actions Medal
Vietnam Gallantry Cross Unit Citation
Vietnam Campaign Medal

Military offices
Preceded by Donald W. Shea	Deputy Chief of Chaplains of the United States Army; 1994–1999	Succeeded by David Hicks
Preceded by Donald W. Shea	Chief of Chaplains of the United States Army; 1999–2003	Succeeded by David Hicks
