= Chief of Chaplains of the United States Army =

Chief supervising officer of the U.S. Army Chaplain Corps

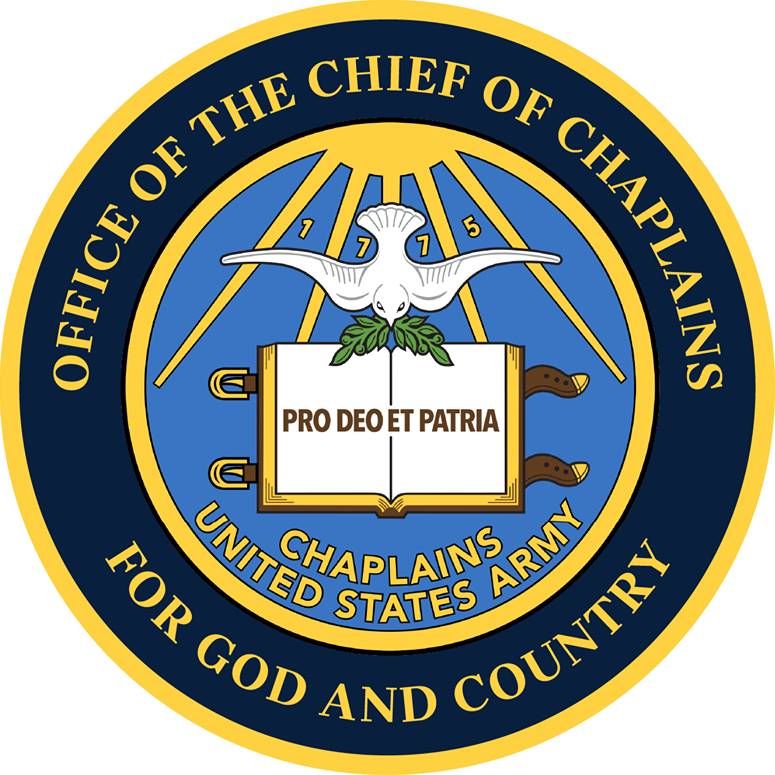
- Seal of the Office of the Chief of Chaplains

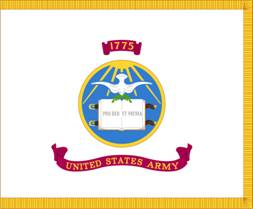
- Flag of the chief of chaplains
- Incumbent vacant since April 2, 2026
- U.S. Army Chaplain Corps; Army Staff
- Abbreviation: OCCH
- Reports to: Chief of Staff of the Army
- Appointer: The president; with Senate advice and consent
- Constituting instrument: National Defense Act of 1920; 10 U.S.C. § 7073
- Formation: June 4, 1920; 106 years ago
- First holder: CH (COL) John T. Axton
- Deputy: Deputy Chief of Chaplains of the United States Army
- Website: Official Website

The chief of chaplains of the United States Army (CCH) is the chief supervising officer of the U.S. Army Chaplain Corps. (Note: Chaplains do not hold commanding authority.) From 1775 to 1920, chaplains were attached to separate units. The Office of the Chief of Chaplains was created by the National Defense Act of 1920 in order to better organize the chaplaincy.

The most recent chief of chaplains, Major General William Green Jr., was removed from the role on April 2, 2026, by Secretary of Defense Pete Hegseth. No successor has been named.

== U.S. Army chiefs of chaplains ==
No.	Rank (Note: Rank column indicates the person's highest rank attained while serving as Chief of Chaplains.)	Name	Photo	Denomination	Term began	Term ended
1	COL	John T. Axton		Congregational	July 15, 1920	April 6, 1928
2	COL	Edmund P. Easterbrook		Methodist	April 7, 1928	December 22, 1929
3	COL	Julian E. Yates		Northern Baptist	December 23, 1929	December 22, 1933
4	COL	Alva J. Brasted		Baptist	December 23, 1933	December 22, 1937
5	MG	William Richard Arnold		Roman Catholic	December 23, 1937	February 14, 1945
6	MG	Luther D. Miller		Episcopalian	April 12, 1945 (acting); July 14, 1945 (appointed)	August 1, 1949
7	MG	Roy H. Parker		Southern Baptist	August 2, 1949	May 27, 1952
8	MG	Ivan L. Bennett		Southern Baptist	May 28, 1952	April 30, 1954
9	MG	Patrick J. Ryan		Roman Catholic	May 1, 1954	October 30, 1958
10	MG	Frank A. Tobey		American Baptist	November 1, 1958	October 31, 1962
11	MG	Charles E. Brown Jr.		United Methodist	November 1, 1962	July 31, 1967
12	MG	Francis L. Sampson		Roman Catholic	August 1, 1967	July 31, 1971
13	MG	Gerhardt W. Hyatt		Lutheran	August 3, 1971	July 29, 1975
14	MG	Orris E. Kelly		Methodist	August 1, 1975	July 1, 1979
15	MG	Kermit D. Johnson		United Presbyterian	July 2, 1979	June 30, 1982
16	MG	Patrick J. Hessian		Roman Catholic	July 1, 1982	June 30, 1986
17	MG	Norris L. Einertson		Lutheran	July 1, 1986	August 26, 1990
18	MG	Matthew A. Zimmerman		National Baptist Convention	August 27, 1990	August 6, 1994
19	MG	Donald W. Shea		Roman Catholic	August 7, 1994	May 31, 1999
20	MG	Gaylord T. Gunhus		Lutheran Brethren	July 1, 1999	July 28, 2003
21	MG	David Hicks		Presbyterian	August 16, 2003	July 11, 2007
22	MG	Douglas L. Carver		Southern Baptist	July 12, 2007	July 21, 2011
23	MG	Donald L. Rutherford		Roman Catholic	July 22, 2011	May 21, 2015
24	MG	Paul K. Hurley		Roman Catholic	May 22, 2015	May 30, 2019
25	MG	Thomas L. Solhjem		Assemblies of God	May 31, 2019	June 20, 2023
26	MG	William Green Jr.		National Baptist Convention	June 20, 2023 (acting); December 5, 2023 (appointed)	April 2, 2026

== See also ==
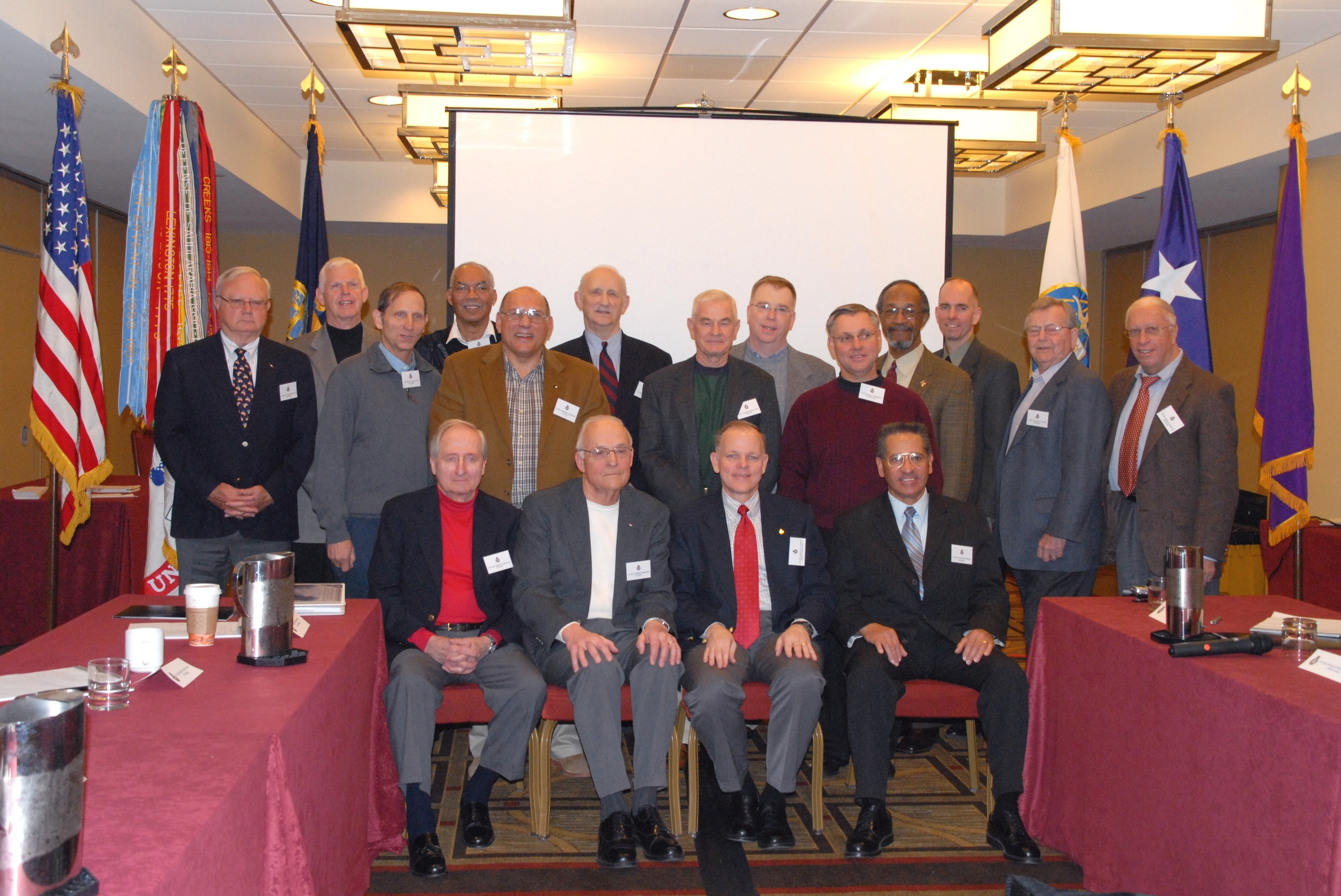
2008 meeting of current and former Army chiefs of chaplains in Arlington, Virginia

- Armed Forces Chaplains Board
- Deputy Chief of Chaplains of the United States Army
- Chiefs of Chaplains of the United States
- International Military Chiefs of Chaplains Conference
