= Kermit D. Johnson =

United States Army chaplain (1928–2020)

Kermit Douglas Johnson
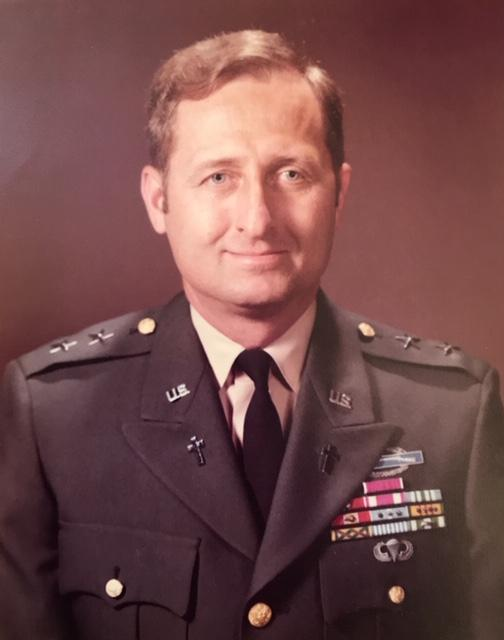
- CH (MG) Kermit Douglas Johnson; 15th Chief of Chaplains of the United States Army
- Born: September 2, 1928; Minneapolis, Minnesota
- Died: January 9, 2020 (aged 91); Saint Paul, Minnesota
- Education: United States Military Academy Class of 1951
- Military career
- Allegiance: United States
- Branch: United States Army
- Service years: 1951–1982
- Rank: Major General
- Commands: U.S. Army Chaplain Corps
- Conflicts: Korean War; Vietnam War
- Awards: Distinguished Service Medal; Bronze Star; Legion of Merit

Kermit Douglas Johnson, USA (September 2, 1928 – January 9, 2020) was an American Army chaplain who served as the 15th Chief of Chaplains of the United States Army from 1979 to 1982.

== Awards and decorations ==
Distinguished Service Medal
Legion of Merit
Bronze Star Medal (with one oak leaf cluster)
Meritorious Service Medal
Joint Service Commendation Medal
National Defense Service Medal
Korean Service Medal
Vietnam Service Medal
United Nations Service Medal
Republic of Vietnam Campaign Medal
Combat Infantryman Badge
Parachutist Badge
Foreign Awards

== Gallery ==
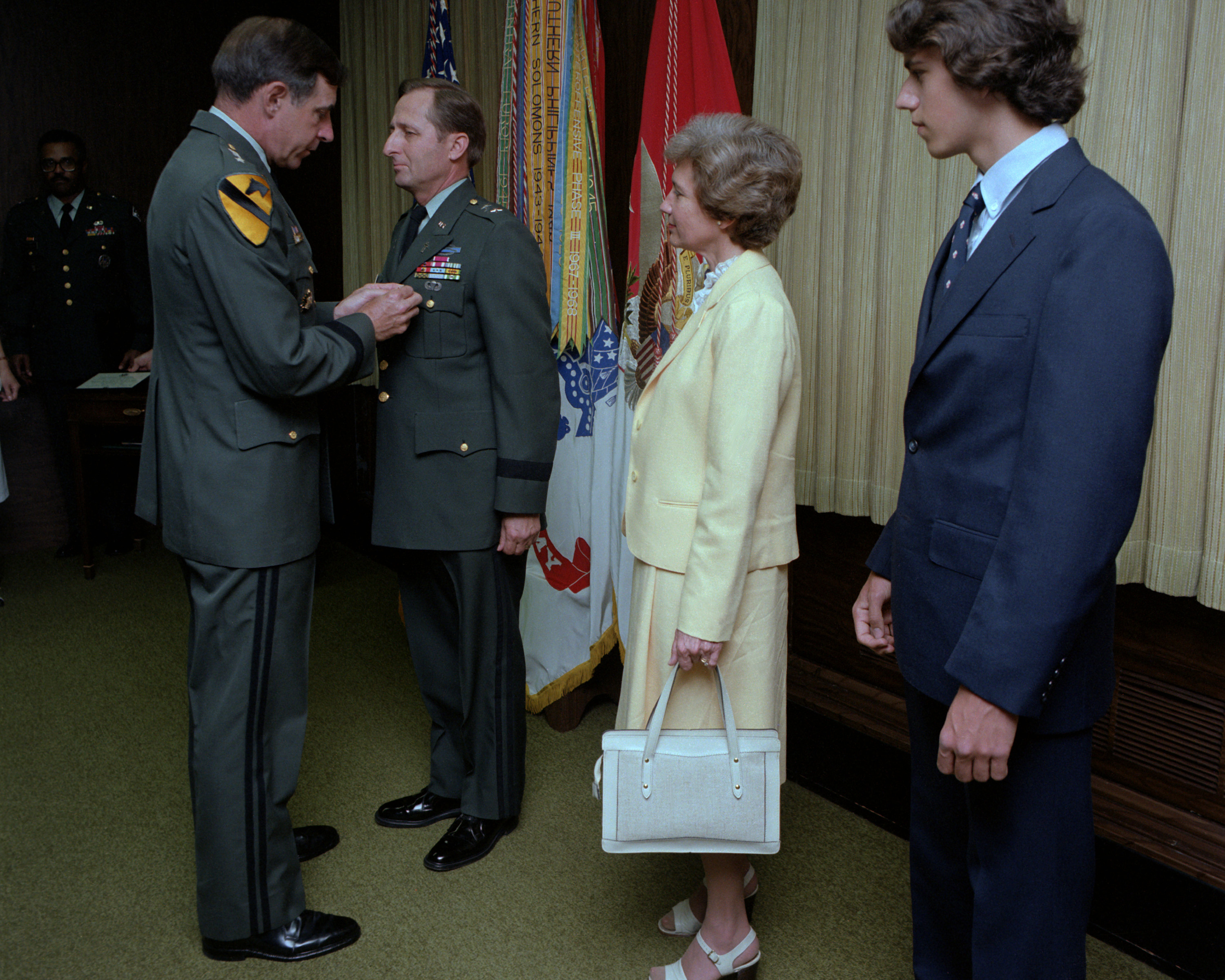

Military offices
Preceded by Thaddeus F. Malanowski	Deputy Chief of Chaplains of the United States Army; 1978–1979	Succeeded by Patrick J. Hessian
Preceded by Orris E. Kelly	Chief of Chaplains of the United States Army; 1979–1982	Succeeded by Patrick J. Hessian
