= Gerhardt W. Hyatt =

United States Army general

Gerhardt Wilfred Hyatt
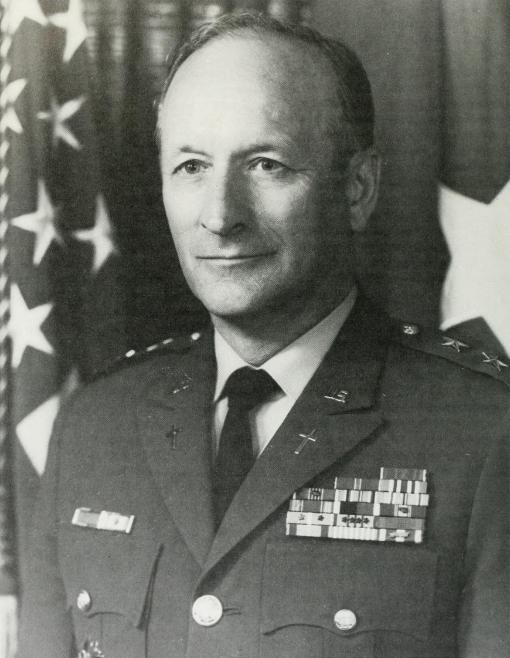
- Major General Gerhardt Wilfred Hyatt; 13th Chief of Chaplains of the United States Army
- Born: July 1, 1916; Melfort, Saskatchewan, Canada
- Died: August 30, 1985 (aged 69); Arlington, Virginia
- Burial place: Arlington National Cemetery; Arlington, Virginia
- Military career
- Allegiance: United States of America
- Branch: United States Army
- Service years: 1945–1975
- Rank: Major general
- Commands: U.S. Army Chaplain Corps
- Conflicts: World War II; Korean War; Vietnam War
- Awards: Distinguished Service Medal; Legion of Merit; Bronze Star

Chaplain (Major General) Gerhardt Wilfred Hyatt, USA (July 1, 1916 – August 30, 1985) was an American Army officer who served as the 13th Chief of Chaplains of the United States Army from 1971 to 1975. He was ordained in the Lutheran Church–Missouri Synod. After his retirement from the army, he became president of Concordia College in St. Paul, Minnesota.

== Awards and decorations ==
Distinguished Service Medal
Legion of Merit
Bronze Star
Joint Service Commendation Medal
Army Commendation Medal (with one bronze oak leaf cluster)
Presidential Unit Citation
Army Meritorious Unit Commendation
Republic of Korea Presidential Unit Citation
American Campaign Medal
Asiatic-Pacific Campaign Medal
World War II Victory Medal
Army of Occupation Medal
National Defense Service Medal (with one bronze service star)
Korean Service Medal (with two bronze service stars)
Vietnam Service Medal (with four bronze service stars)
Vietnam Armed Forces Honor Medal
Vietnam Staff Service Medal
United Nations Service Medal for Korea
Vietnam Campaign Medal

== Gallery ==
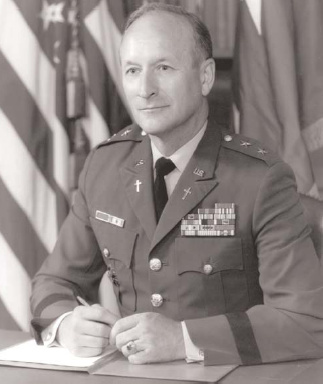

Military offices
Preceded by Francis L. Sampson	Chief of Chaplains of the United States Army; 1971–1975	Succeeded by Orris E. Kelly
