= Francis L. Sampson =

United States Army general (1912–1996)

The Reverend Monsignor Francis L. Sampson
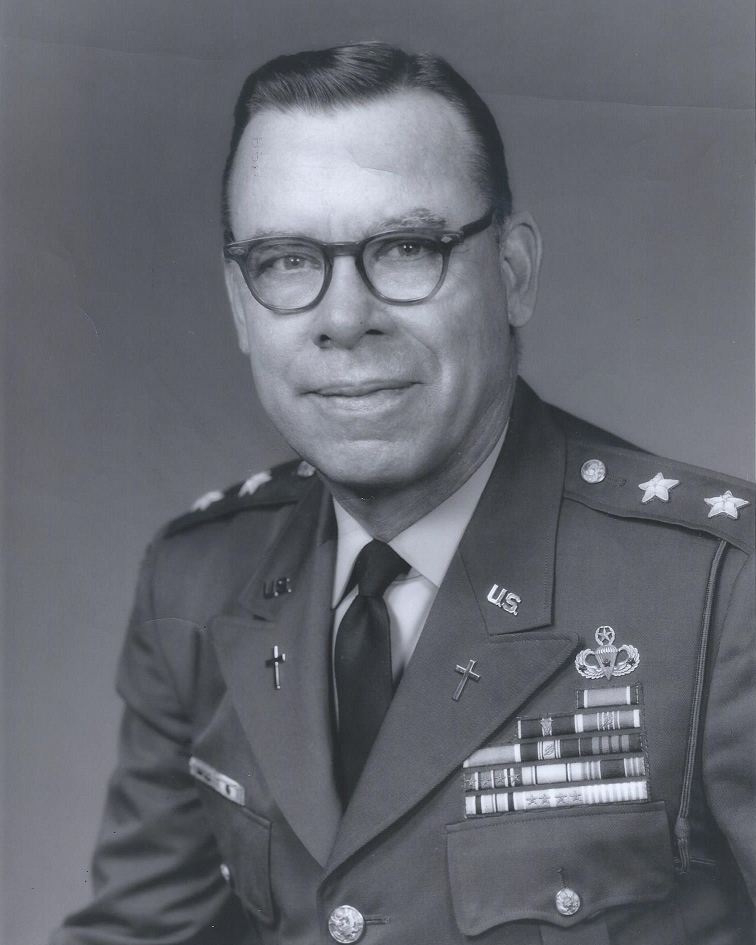
- Official portrait of Chaplain (MG) Sampson, 1967
- Born: 29 February 1912; Cherokee, Iowa, US
- Died: 28 January 1996 (aged 83); Sioux Falls, South Dakota, US
- Burial place: St Catherine Cemetery; Luverne, Minnesota, US
- Military career
- Allegiance: United States
- Branch: United States Army
- Service years: 1942–1971
- Rank: Major General
- Nickname: The Parachuting Padre
- Commands: U.S. Army Chaplain Corps
- Conflicts: World War II; Korean War
- Awards: Distinguished Service Cross; Bronze Star Medal (1+1 "V" Device); Army Commendation Medal
- Church: Catholic (Latin Church)

Orders
- Ordination: 1 June 1941 (priesthood) by Gerald Thomas Bergan
- Rank: Domestic prelate (6 January 1963)

Francis Leon Sampson (29 February 1912 – 28 January 1996) was an American Catholic priest and military officer who served as the 12th Chief of Chaplains of the United States Army from 1967 to 1971. A World War II paratrooper chaplain who participated in the D-Day landings and the Battle of the Bulge, Sampson was captured during both engagements and spent time in prisoner-of-war camps. He also served in the Korean War. A decorated war hero, he received the Bronze Star, Purple Heart, and Distinguished Service Cross and was nominated for the Medal of Honor.

== Early life ==
Francis L. Sampson was born on 29 February 1912 in Cherokee, Iowa, to Mr. and Mrs. Harvey Sampson. His father was a hotel manager; his mother helped with the food service. He attended Cathedral High School in Sioux Falls, South Dakota, and Franklin High School in Portland, Oregon. He attended the University of Notre Dame, graduating in 1936, and then entered the Saint Paul Seminary in Saint Paul, Minnesota, where he completed a degree in theology in 1941. He was ordained to the Roman Catholic priesthood for the Diocese of Des Moines, Iowa, on 1 June 1941. Following his ordination, Father Sampson served briefly as a parish priest in Neola, Iowa, and also taught at Dowling Catholic High School in Des Moines.

== Military career ==
Sampson entered the Army chaplaincy in 1942 as a first lieutenant. After training at Camp Barkeley and Fort Benning, he joined the 501st Parachute Infantry Regiment of the 101st Airborne Division as the regimental chaplain.

=== Normandy landings ===
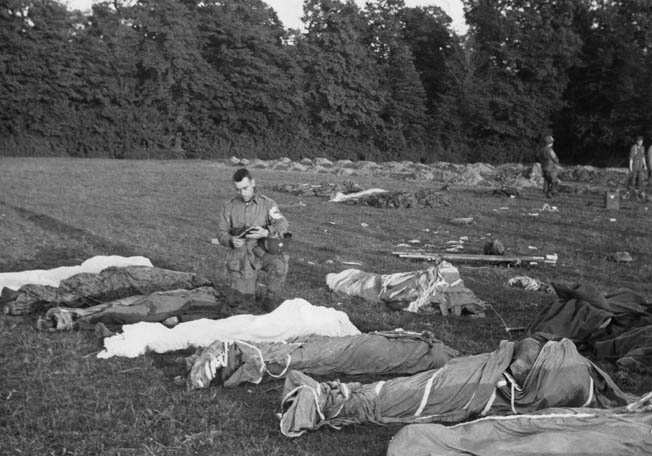
Sampson conducting burial in a makeshift cemetery in Normandy

With the 501st Parachute Infantry Regiment, Sampson assisted in the D-Day landings. He was on the first flight and landed in the Douve River, diving several times to retrieve his Mass kit. The 501st helped to gain an Allied toehold at Carentan on the coast of France. Sampson stayed with the wounded who could not be moved at a large farmhouse, which had been used as the unit's command post until it moved farther away from enemy lines.

The area became taken over by units of the 6. Fallschirmjäger. He was taken prisoner by two soldiers, who did not believe his non-combatant status as they had never seen a paratrooper chaplain before. Sampson was put up against a hedgerow to be shot; Sampson recalled that he was so frightened that instead of reciting an Act of Contrition, the usual prayer for the forgiveness of sins, he kept repeating to himself the Catholic blessing before meals. (Note: The Catholic Prayer before Meals: "Bless us, O Lord, and these Thy gifts, which we are about to receive through Thy bounty through Christ Our Lord, Amen.") Rescued at the last minute by a German noncommissioned officer who was Catholic, Sampson was escorted to a nearby German intelligence post, where he was interrogated, found harmless and then released. He returned to the medic station at Basse-Addeville (Saint-Côme-du-Mont) and helped treat both German and American wounded soldiers.

General Dwight D. Eisenhower recommended Sampson for the Medal of Honor for his courage on D-Day. Sampson did not end up receiving the Medal of Honor as George C. Marshall did not consider it appropriate for non-combatants such as chaplains to receive it. Sampson instead received the Distinguished Service Cross.

=== Battle of the Bulge ===
After briefly returning to England, Sampson jumped into Holland on 19 December 1944, landing in a moat around a castle. Participating in the Battle of the Bulge, he ended up being captured by German forces in Belgium, near Bastogne. He spent six months in a German prison near Berlin until the liberation of the camp in April 1945. Sampson insisted on being in the enlisted area of the camp rather than the more comfortable area for imprisoned officers. He received the Bronze Star for his work among the prisoners. As the camp was being bombed by Allied forces, Sampson tended to the wounded and dying.

Sampson was briefly in Japan after the end of the war.

=== Post–World War II ===
In October 1945, Sampson returned to the United States and briefly served again at Dowling Catholic High School in Des Moines. He returned to active duty in July 1946, as a regimental chaplain with the 505th Parachute Infantry Regiment, 82nd Airborne Division. He was regimental chaplain with the 187th Airborne Infantry Regiment from 1947 to 1951. In 1950, he para dropped into Korea, near Sunchon. His time in Korea was spent trying to save American prisoners of war. After that deployment, he served as an instructor at the U.S. Army Chaplain School at Fort Slocum, New York, until 1954. For some time he was assigned to Fort Monroe in Virginia. He was named a monsignor with the rank domestic prelate on 6 January 1963. In 1961, Sampson was promoted to full colonel. He served as Seventh Army Chaplain from 1962 to 1965 and then as the USCONARC Staff Chaplain in 1965. He also briefly served Cardinal Francis Spellman, at the time Apostolic Vicar for the Military Services, as a vicar delegate for Europe in July 1962.

=== Chief of Chaplains ===
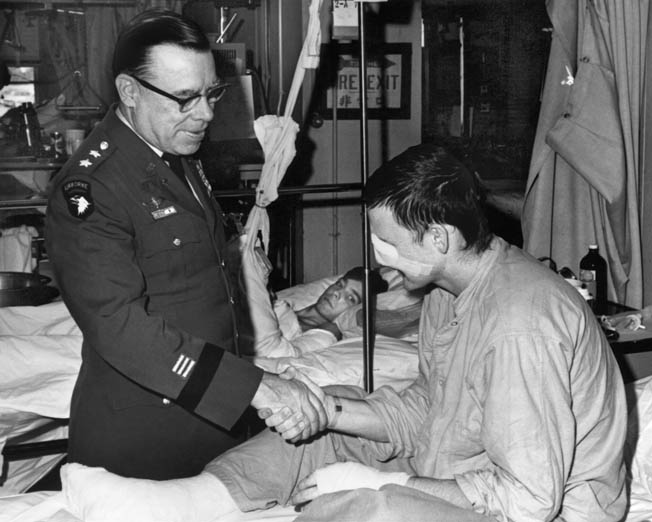
Sampson visits soldiers wounded in Vietnam at a military hospital in Japan in 1971.

In 1966, Sampson was appointed as the Deputy Chief of Chaplains of the United States Army and promoted to the rank of brigadier general. On 28 July 1967, he was nominated by Lyndon B. Johnson for the office of Chief of Chaplains. The Senate confirmed the nomination on 18 August 1967; as such, Sampson was promoted to major general. In the midst of the Vietnam War, the appointment of a decorated war hero as the Chief of Chaplains was seen as a way to rehabilitate the image of the military; however, he faced a great uphill battle. During the Vietnam War, he made annual Christmas visits to the troops. He noted the issues with drugs and alcohol that the soldiers struggled with and saw it as a spiritual issue that chaplains were responsible for caring for. Prior to his retirement, he approved a five-year plan for the chaplaincy, focusing on ministry, training, and administration.

Sampson retired as Chief of Chaplains on 31 July 1971.

== Later years ==
After his retirement, Sampson was installed as pastor of Saint Mary's Catholic Church, Shenandoah, Iowa, on 1 September 1971. From 1971 to 1974, he was the national president of the United Service Organizations. In 1977, he incardinated to the Diocese of Sioux Falls and became an advocate for O'Gorman Catholic High School, the successor of his alma mater, Cathedral High School. From 1983 to 1987, Sampson was an assistant to Theodore Hesburgh as Director of the Reserve Officers' Training Corps at the University of Notre Dame.

Sampson died of cancer at age 83 on 28 January 1996. He is buried at St Catherine Cemetery in Luverne, Minnesota.

== Legacy ==
Sampson amassed over 100 jumps as a paratrooper. He wrote two books about his experiences, The Paratrooper Padre in 1948 and Look Out Below! in 1958.

Two years after Sampson's death, the film Saving Private Ryan was released. The film was loosely based on the story of a soldier named Fritz Niland. During the course of the D-Day attacks, Fritz learned his brothers William and Roland had died on 6 and 7 June, and a third brother, Edward, had gone missing over Burma in the Pacific Theater. After learning this, Sampson insisted to Fritz that arrangements be made for his return to the United States, and filed the paperwork to do so. Edward was later found in a prisoner-of-war camp and returned home after the war.

Sampson is one of four alumni of the Saint Paul Seminary in St. Paul, Minnesota, to become the Chief of Chaplains of the United States Army, the other three being Patrick J. Ryan, Patrick J. Hessian, and Donald W. Shea.

== Awards and decorations ==
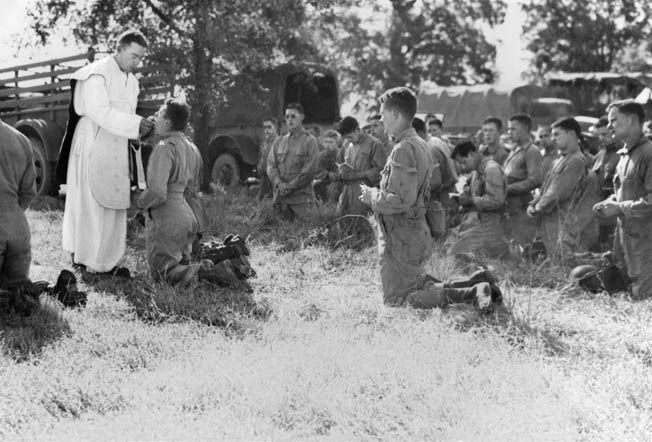
Sampson distributing communion to members of the 501st Parachute Infantry Regiment at training in Tennessee in 1943

Sampson's military achievements include:

Distinguished Service Cross
Bronze Star (with valor device)
Army Commendation Medal (with one bronze oak leaf cluster)
Purple Heart
Presidential Unit Citation (with two bronze oak leaf clusters)
Prisoner of War Medal
American Defense Service Medal
American Campaign Medal
European-African-Middle Eastern Campaign Medal (with arrowhead device and two bronze service stars)
World War II Victory Medal
Army of Occupation Medal
National Defense Service Medal
Korean Service Medal (with four bronze service stars)
French Croix de Guerre with Palm
Republic of Korea Presidential Unit Citation
United Nations Service Medal for Korea

== Notes ==
Military offices
Preceded by Charles E. Brown Jr.	Chief of Chaplains of the United States Army; 1967–1971	Succeeded by Gerhardt W. Hyatt
