= John T. Axton =

United States Army officer (1870–1934)

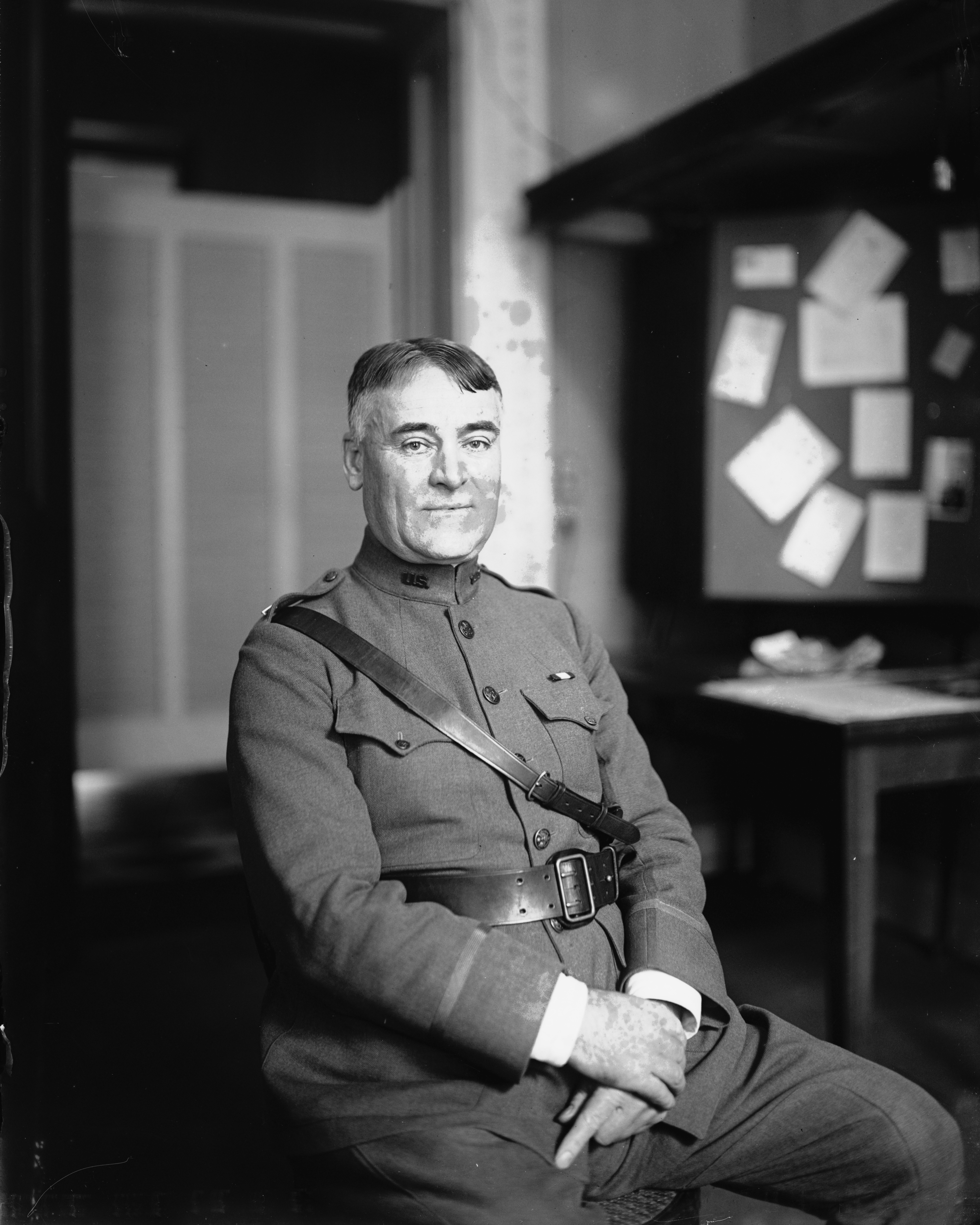
- Axton in 1921
- Born: John Thomas Axton; July 28, 1870; Salt Lake City, Utah, U.S.
- Died: July 20, 1934 (aged 63); Washington, D.C., U.S.
- Burial place: Arlington National Cemetery
- Spouse: Jane Bean (m. 1891)
- Children: 4
- Military career
- Branch: United States Army
- Service years: 1902–1928
- Rank: Colonel
- Commands: U.S. Army Chaplain Corps
- Conflicts: World War I
- Awards: Distinguished Service Medal; Legion of Honour; War Merit Cross

John Thomas Axton (July 28, 1870 – July 20, 1934) was a colonel in the United States Army who served as the first chief of chaplains from 1920 to 1928.

== Early life and education ==
John Thomas Axton was born on July 28, 1870, in Salt Lake City, Utah. He attended Salt Lake public schools and the Salt Lake Academy.

== Career ==
Axton was secretary of the Salt Lake City YMCA. He served as general secretary for the YMCA from 1893 to 1902.

In June 1901, Axton entered the Congregational Church ministry. He was appointed as chaplain with the rank of captain with the United States Army on July 25, 1902. He served in the Philippines from 1903 to 1904 and from 1907 to 1908. During the winter of 1913, him and his men provided relief to the soldiers of Salvador Mercado. He was stationed at the Mexican border for five years. He was commissioned as a major on March 4, 1917. He was promoted to colonel in 1920.

During World War I, Axton ran philanthropic, social, and religious organization in Hoboken, New Jersey. On July 15, 1920, he became the Army's first chief of chaplains. He held that post until his retirement on April 6, 1928. He then worked as chaplain of Rutgers University.

== Personal life ==
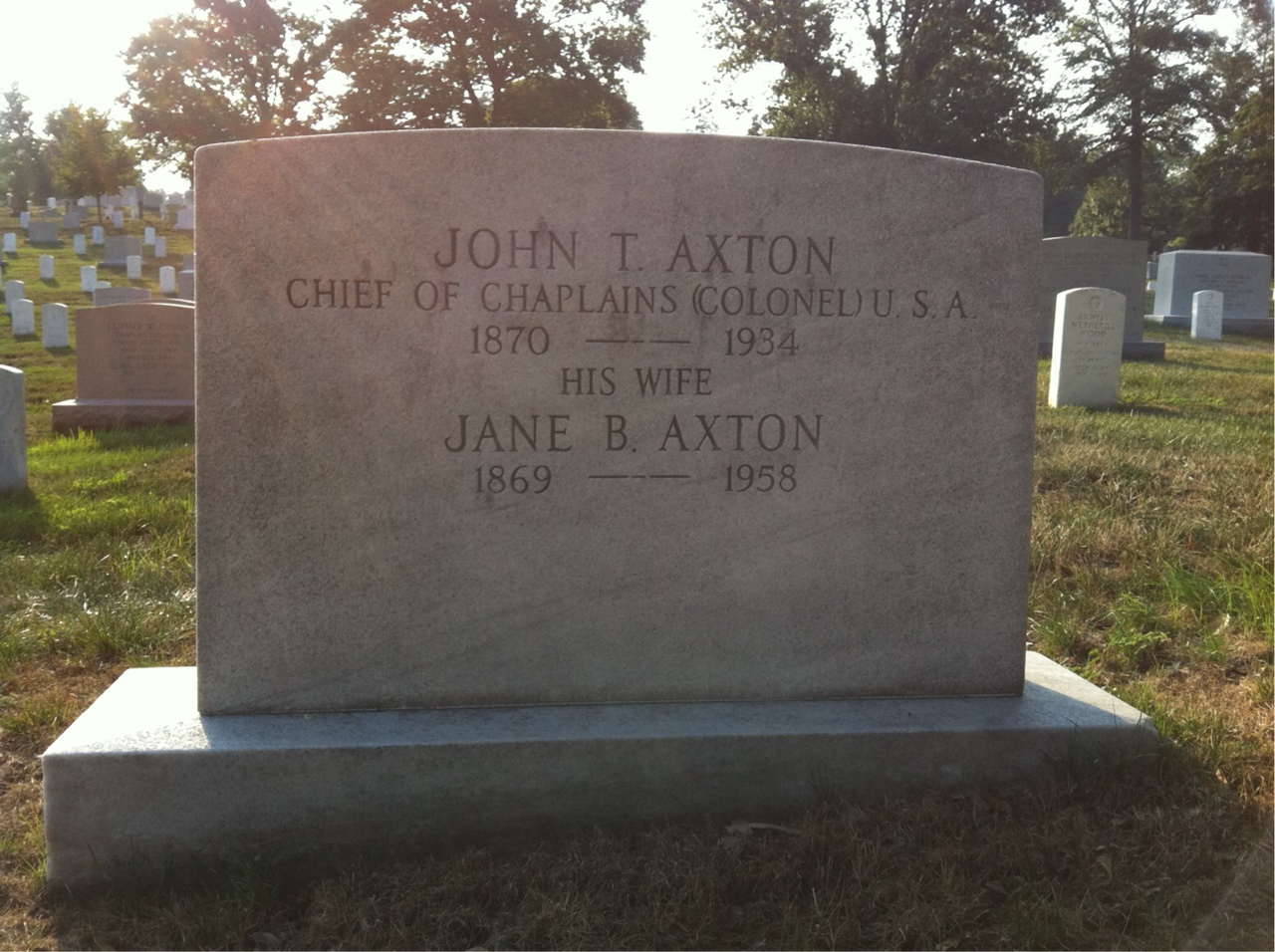
Grave of Axton at Arlington National Cemetery

Axton married Jane Bean on August 28, 1891, in Salt Lake City. They had four children, John T. Jr., Matilda, Lily Jane, and Anna. He lived on Porter Avenue in Washington, D.C.

Axton had a stroke on May 18, 1934, and was bedridden following. He died on July 20, 1934, at his home in Washington, D.C. He was buried in Arlington National Cemetery.

== Awards ==
Axton received the Army Distinguished Service Medal in 1919 for his services during World War I. He was awarded the rank of Knight (Chevalier) of the French Legion of Honor in 1922. He received the Italian War Merit Cross in 1922.

In 1919, Axton received an honorary Doctor of Divinity from Middlebury College in Vermont. In 1923, he received honorary Doctor of Divinity degrees from Ursinus College and Elon College.

== Gallery ==
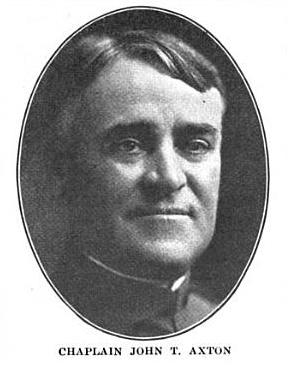

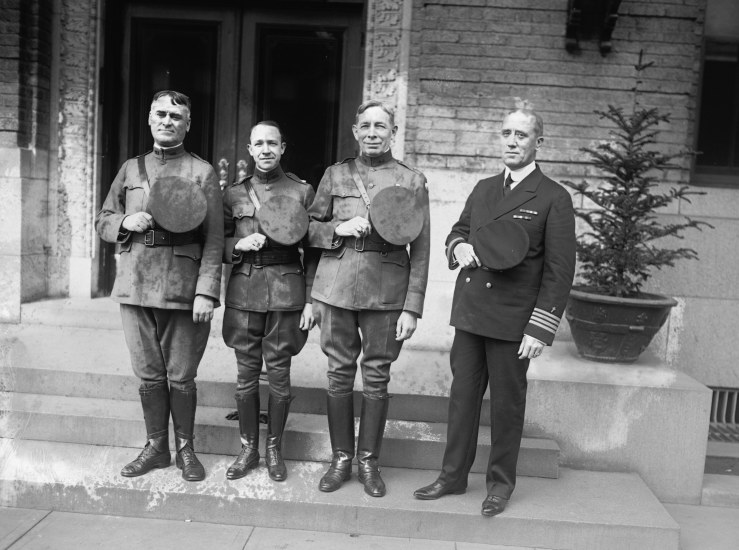

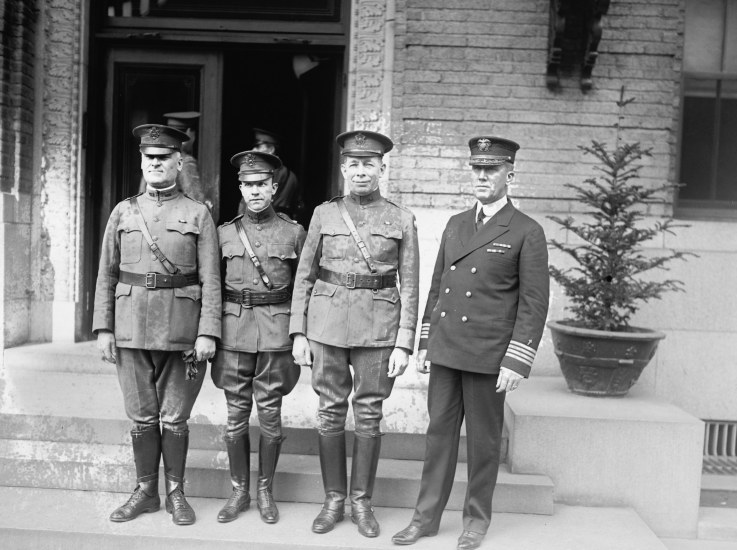

Military offices
Preceded by None	Chief of Chaplains of the United States Army; 1920–1928	Succeeded by Edmund P. Easterbrook
