= James Hugh O'Neill =

United States Army chaplain (1892–1972)

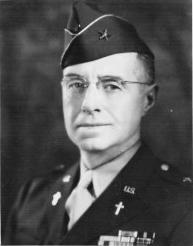
- Chaplain (Brigadier General) James Hugh O'Neill; 3rd Deputy Chief of Chaplains of the United States Army
- Born: January 14, 1892; Chicago, Illinois, U.S.
- Died: April 17, 1972 (aged 80); Pueblo, Colorado, U.S.
- Burial place: Roselawn Cemetery; Pueblo, Colorado
- Military career
- Allegiance: United States of America
- Branch: United States Army
- Service years: 1926 – 1952
- Rank: Brigadier General
- Conflicts: World War II
- Awards: Bronze Star; Legion of Merit

Rt. Rev. Msgr. James Hugh O'Neill (January 14, 1892 – April 17, 1972) was an American Catholic priest who served as a chaplain in the United States Army from 1926 to 1952, rising to the rank of brigadier general. While serving as chaplain of the Third United States Army during the Battle of the Bulge in World War II, he composed the famous "Weather Prayer" at the request of the Third Army's commander, General George S. Patton.

== Early life and education ==
James Hugh O'Neill was born on January 14, 1892, the son of William O'Neill and Catherine Enright O'Neill. After receiving his Bachelor of Arts degree (1911) and Master of Arts degree (1913) from Loyola University (Chicago), he entered Saint Paul Seminary School of Divinity in St. Paul, Minnesota, and was ordained a Roman Catholic priest on May 20, 1915.

== Early career ==
Father O'Neill was then assigned to the Roman Catholic Diocese of Helena, Montana and appointed to the faculty of Carroll College in Helena in the fall of 1915. While at Carroll, he was Professor of Physics, Registrar, Dean of Men, and Vice President (1921–26).

== Military career ==
In 1926, Father O'Neill entered the Chaplain Service of the US Army. He saw duty throughout the United States (1929–1934; 1936–1942) and the Philippine Islands (1927–1929; 1934–1936), and served on the staffs of General Jacob Devers (1942–44) and General George Patton (1944–46) in the European Theater of Operations.

During the Battle of the Bulge Patton desired good weather for his advance, which would permit close ground support by U.S. Army Air Forces tactical aircraft, and requested that O'Neill compose a suitable prayer. O'Neill complied, and his prayer was printed and distributed to unit members:

Almighty and most merciful Father, we humbly beseech Thee, of Thy great goodness, to restrain these immoderate rains with which we have had to contend. Grant us fair weather for Battle. Graciously hearken to us as soldiers who call upon Thee that, armed with Thy power, we may advance from victory to victory and crush the oppression and wickedness of our enemies, and establish Thy justice among men and nations. Amen.

When the weather cleared soon after, Patton awarded O'Neill a Bronze Star Medal.

O'Neill later served on the staff of General Courtney Hodges (1946–1948) at Ft Jay, Governor's Island, New York. He was promoted to Brigadier General and became Deputy Chief of Chaplains of the United States Army, at Ft Myer, Arlington, Virginia (1948–1952). His awards and decorations include the Bronze Star with Oak Leaf Cluster, the Legion of Merit with Oak Leaf Cluster, the Croix de Guerre with Palm from France, the Croix de Guerre with Palm from Belgium, the Croix de Guerre from the Grand Duchy of Luxembourg, the American Theatre Medal, and the American Defense Medal. He also earned battle stars for the campaigns of Normandy, Northern France, Ardennes, Rhineland, and Central Europe.

== Retirement ==
In 1952, Msgr. O'Neill retired from the US Army and continued his priestly ministry at the Cathedral of the Sacred Heart, Diocese of Pueblo, Pueblo, Colorado. He died on April 17, 1972, in Pueblo, Colorado in the 57th year of his priesthood and the 81st year of his life. He was buried in the Bishop's Section of Roselawn Cemetery, Pueblo, Colorado.

== In popular culture ==
Msgr. O'Neill was portrayed by Lionel Murton in the 1970 film Patton.
