= Chaplain Corps (United States Army) =

U.S. Army's branch for religious services of multiple faiths

United States Army Chaplain Corps
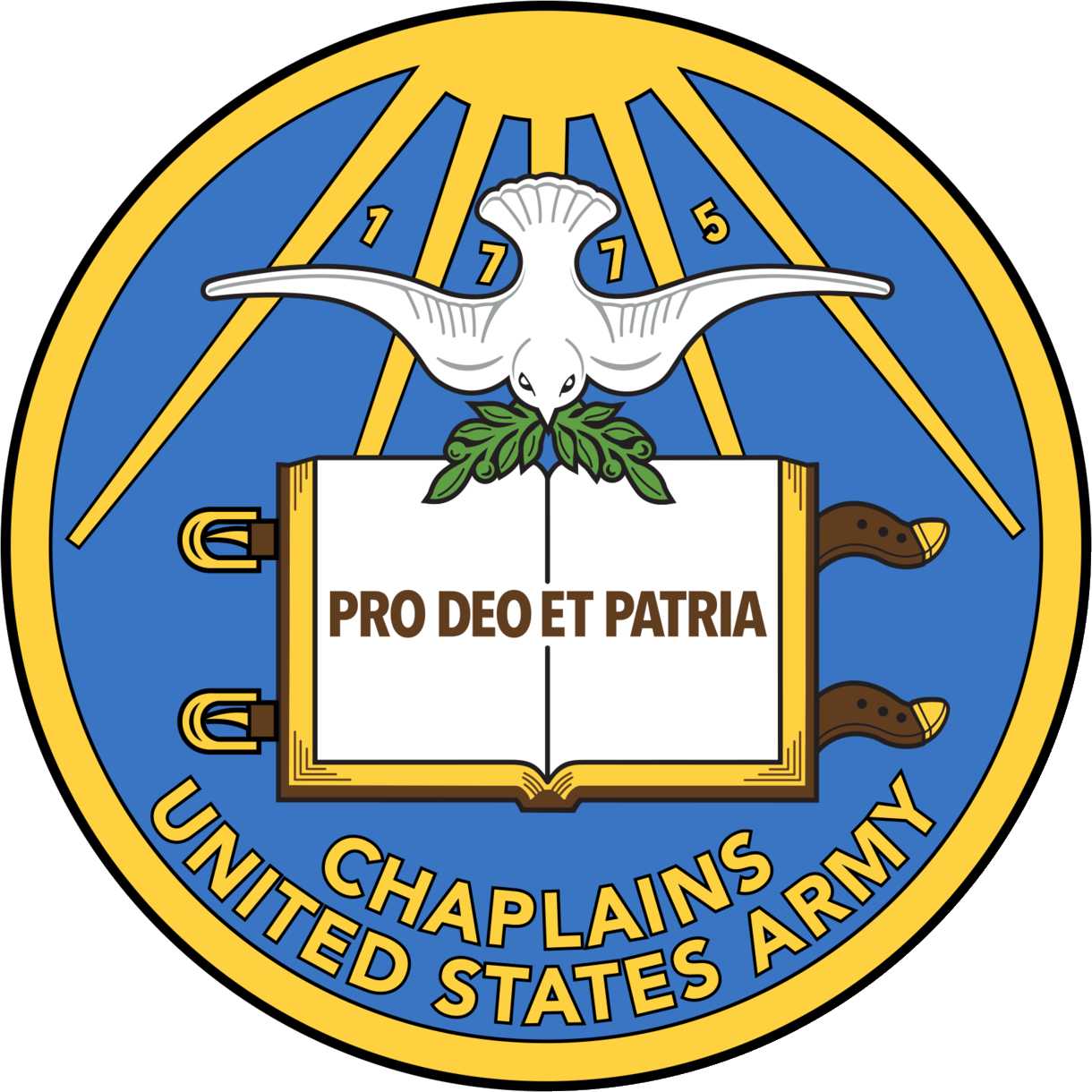
- Branch plaque
- Active: 29 July 1775 – present
- Country: United States of America
- Branch: United States Army
- Type: Corps
- Role: Military Chaplaincy
- Size: 2,700
- Mottos: "Pro Deo et Patria" (Latin: For God and Country)
- Colors: Black
- March: "Soldiers of God"
- Engagements: American Revolutionary War; War of 1812; Mexican–American War; American Civil War; Spanish–American War; World War I; World War II; Korean War; Vietnam War; Gulf War Somali Civil War; Kosovo War; War in Afghanistan; Iraq War
- Website: Official website

Commanders
- CCH: Vacant
- DCCH: CH (COL) Richard W. West
- Notable commanders: CH (COL) John T. Axton; CH (MG) William R. Arnold; CH (MG) Francis L. Sampson; CH (MG) Kermit D. Johnson; CH (MG) Patrick J. Hessian; CH (MG) Gaylord T. Gunhus

Insignia
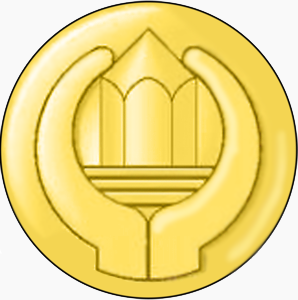
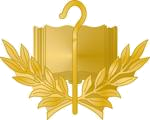
- Branch insignia

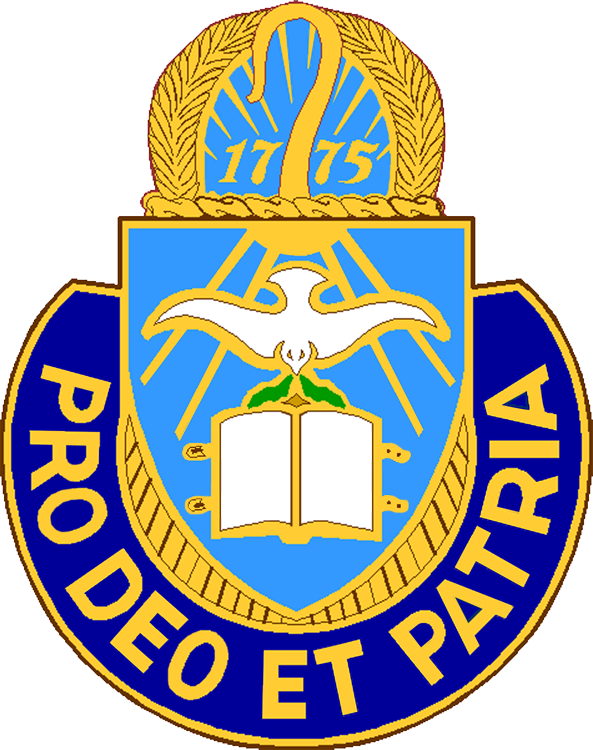
- Distinctive unit insignia

The United States Army Chaplain Corps (USACC) consists of ordained clergy of multiple faiths who are commissioned Army officers serving as military chaplains as well as enlisted soldiers who serve as assistants. Their purpose is to offer religious church services, counseling, and moral support to the armed forces, whether in peacetime or at war.

Established on 29 July 1775, by an act of Congress to serve the Continental Army, the chaplaincy has been involved in every armed conflict in which the United States has partaken. Many different modes of operation and structures have been used over the course of the Corps' existence; currently, chaplains, duly endorsed by a religious body, serve as commissioned officers alongside an enlisted Religious Affairs Specialist; together, they make a Unit Ministry Team, assigned to battalion-level units and higher.

== History ==
=== Revolutionary War ===
Prior to the formal establishment of chaplains within the Continental Army, clergy were already serving within regiments of their respective colonial militias at the pleasure of the regimental commander. However, the Chaplain Corps formally traces its origins to 29 July 1775, when Congress passed a resolution establishing pay for various roles within the Continental Army. Chaplains were allotted $20 per month ($622.70 in 2025)). This action officially recognized the men already serving within the Continental Army, either appointed specifically by their respective colonies or helping on a part-time basis. Throughout the fall of 1775, the number of chaplains fluctuated up and down from as low as fifteen to as high as twenty two. Seeking more stability within the chaplaincy, on 31 December 1775 George Washington asked for a pay raise for the chaplains, noting that some owed more money to the clergy replacing them in their church than they were being paid by the military. On 16 January 1776, Congress approved a pay raise to $33.50 per month ($1,043 in 2025).

=== Legal challenges ===
In November 1979, two Harvard law students, Joel Katcoff and Allen Wieder, filed a lawsuit in federal court challenging the constitutionality of the chaplaincy. They stated that paying chaplains to conduct prayer services was an unconstitutional act of governmental support for a religion. After various rulings and appeals, Katcoff and Wieder sought to drop the suit; Chief of Chaplains Patrick J. Hessian argued that the case should be brought to completion. The case was eventually dismissed with prejudice.

== Operation ==
=== Non-combatant status ===
The First Geneva Convention specified medical staff and chaplains were to be given the "benefit of ... neutrality" and to be "protected and respected" on the battlefield, provided that they maintain non-combatant bearing. However, this did not formally ban chaplains from bearing arms; medical personnel were regularly allowed to maintain weapons to defend themselves, but could not use them for offensive action. Army manuals throughout the early-to-mid 20th century did not explicitly prohibit the carrying of weapons. One chaplain during World War II recounted being told to carry a defensive weapons so that his uniform could not be stolen by the enemy to be used deceptively. Several chaplains during the Vietnam War recounted carrying weapons for defense as well. In 1989, the Army explicitly directed that chaplains do not bear arms; all other branches of the US military now hold this position as well.

== Training ==
The U.S. Army Chaplain School was approved on 9 February 1918. Its first session began on 3 March 1918, at Fort Monroe, Virginia. It subsequently moved to Camp Zachary Taylor (Kentucky), Camp Grant (Illinois), Fort Leavenworth (Kansas), Fort Benjamin Harrison (Indiana), Harvard University (Massachusetts), Fort Devens (Mass.), Fort Oglethorpe (Georgia), Carlisle Barracks (Pennsylvania), Fort Slocum (New York) (1951–62), Fort Hamilton (N.Y.) (1962–74), Fort Wadsworth (N.Y.) (1974–79), and Fort Monmouth (New Jersey) (1979–95). It moved to Fort Jackson in South Carolina in 1996.

== Notable Chaplains ==
Since the American Civil War, seven Army chaplains and one chaplain assistant have been awarded the Medal of Honor.

=== Other notable chaplains ===
- Patrick J. Boyle – Colonel, US Army, Roman Catholic Chaplain for the 82nd Airborne Division and 1st Air Cavalry Division, serving three tours during the Vietnam War. Awarded two Silver Stars, three Bronze Stars, Air Medal, and Parachutist Badge.
- Pratima Dharm - First Hindu Chaplain.
- Francis P. Duffy – Chaplain during World War I, the most highly decorated cleric in the history of the U.S. Army.
- Herman G. Felhoelter – Chaplain during the Korean War. Killed in Chaplain–Medic massacre.
- John Gano - Chaplain during Revolutionary War. He crossed the Delaware River with General George Washington and allegedly baptized him.
- Augustus F. Gearhard - US Army Catholic chaplain who received the Distinguished Service Cross during World War I, then the Silver Star and Legion of Merit during World War II as a chaplain in the Army Air Forces. Transferred to US Air Force in 1947 and retired as a brigadier general in 1953 after serving as Deputy Chief of Chaplains of the Air Force.
- Dale Goetz – Chaplain during Afghanistan War. First U.S. Army chaplain to be killed in action since the Vietnam War.
- William Green Jr. - First chaplain to ever be fired. No official explanation was given.
- Milton L. Haney – Chaplain during the Civil War. Called "The Fighting Chaplain" by the men of the 55th Illinois Infantry. Awarded the Medal of Honor
- Philip Hannan – Chaplain during World War II.
- Alice M. Henderson – First woman, and woman of color commissioned as a chaplain in the U.S. Army Chaplain Corps
- Emil Kapaun — Catholic Army chaplain who served during the Korean War and was noted for his acts of self-sacrifice, earning him a Bronze Star Medal. He died in a North Korean internment camp and was posthumously awarded the Medal of Honor.
- Abraham Klausner – Chaplain during and after World War II who cared for the more than 30,000 survivors found at Dachau concentration camp, shortly after it was liberated in April 1945, as well as for thousands more in other Displaced Persons camps in southern Germany.
- John McElroy, SJ – One of two of the Army's first Catholic chaplains. Chaplain during the Mexican–American War, founder of St. John's Literary Institute, Boston College High School, and Boston College.
- Abdul-Rasheed Muhammad – First Muslim chaplain in the United States Army, 1993
- Anthony Rey, S.J. – One of two of the Army's first Catholic chaplains. Chaplain during the Mexican–American War and Vice President of Georgetown College (1845). First Catholic chaplain killed during service with the U.S. military.
- Justin Roberts – Chaplain with the 2nd Battalion, 327th Infantry Regiment, 101st Airborne Division, during the war in Afghanistan. Filmed his unit's 2010–11 deployment to Kunar Province and directed the resulting documentary No Greater Love (2015).
- John Rosbrugh – Chaplain during the Revolutionary War. First U.S. chaplain killed in battle.
- H. Timothy Vakoc – Chaplain during Iraq War of 2003-2011. Believed to be the only U.S. military chaplain to be seriously injured in the Iraq War.
- Matthew A. Zimmerman – The 18th Chief of Chaplains of the United States Army from 1990 to 1994 and the first African American to hold the position.

== Army Chief of Chaplains ==
The Office of the Chief of Chaplains was created by the National Defense Act of 1920 in order to better organize the chaplaincy; the position was first held by John T. Axton. The current Chief of Chaplains is Chaplain (Brigadier General) Jack Stumme.
