= Archdiocese for the Military Services, USA =

Catholic ecclesiastical jurisdiction

Archdiocese for the Military Services, USA Ordinariatus Militaris Civitatum Fœderatarum Americae Septentrionalis
- The coat of arms

Location
- Country: United States
- Ecclesiastical province: Immediately subject to the Holy See
- Headquarters: Washington, D.C.
- Coordinates: 38.9354°N 76.9921°W

Information
- Denomination: Catholic Church
- Sui iuris church: Latin Church; Eastern Catholic Church
- Rite: Multiple Rites (primarily the Roman Rite)
- Established: July 21, 1986; 40 years ago

Current leadership
- Pope: Leo XIV
- Archbishop: Timothy Broglio
- Auxiliary Bishops: Neal Buckon; Joseph L. Coffey; William Muhm; Gregg M. Caggianelli
- Bishops emeritus: F. Richard Spencer; Richard Higgins

Website
- www.milarch.org

The Archdiocese for the Military Services, USA (AMS), officially the Military Ordinariate of United States of America, is a jurisdiction of the Catholic Church for people serving in the United States Armed Forces and their dependents.

The AMS provides services to Catholics serving in military installations in the United States and overseas, to Catholic staff and patients at Veterans Health Administration facilities, and to Catholics at other federal services located overseas. The AMS does not have a cathedral, nor does it have jurisdiction over any territory; its headquarters are in Washington, D.C.

The AMS is considered a military ordinariate, headed by Archbishop Timothy P. Broglio.

== Description ==
The AMS was originally established as a military vicariate, with the Archbishop of New York serving as the military vicar. It was reorganized as an archdiocese, with its own archbishop. Its headquarters was relocated from New York City to Washington by Pope John Paul II in 1986.

While the AMS is a Latin Church jurisdiction, clergy from the Eastern Catholic Churches may receive endorsement by the AMS. Eastern Catholic priests must maintain bi-ritual faculties and be able to celebrate the sacraments in the ordinary form of the Roman Rite.

The AMS archbishop is assisted by several auxiliary bishops. Together, they oversee Catholic priests serving as chaplains throughout the world. Each chaplain remains incardinated into the diocese or religious institute in which he was ordained. He has an officer's rank, based on his years of service and promotion selection from among their peers. The chaplain wears the uniform of his respective branch of service, and normally wear clerical attire only during the performance of a religious service. The position of rank and chaplain faith group insignia varies in each military department and may vary significantly from one type of uniform to another within a military department.

The chaplains are organized in the following active duty branches:

- U.S. Army Chaplain Corps– for the US Army
- Navy Chaplain Corps – for the US Navy, the US Marine Corps and the US Coast Guard
- Air Force Chaplain Corps – for the US Air Force
- United States Space Command – has a command chaplain

The chaplains also serve in reserve components of the US Army, Navy, and Air Force and are subject to the AMS jurisdiction when deployed and when in training status:

- Army National Guard
- Air National Guard
- Army Reserve Command
- US Navy Reserve

The AMS jurisdiction extends to Catholics on all United States government property in the United States and abroad. These include U.S. military installations, embassies, consulates and other diplomatic missions.

== History ==
=== 1917 to 1968 ===
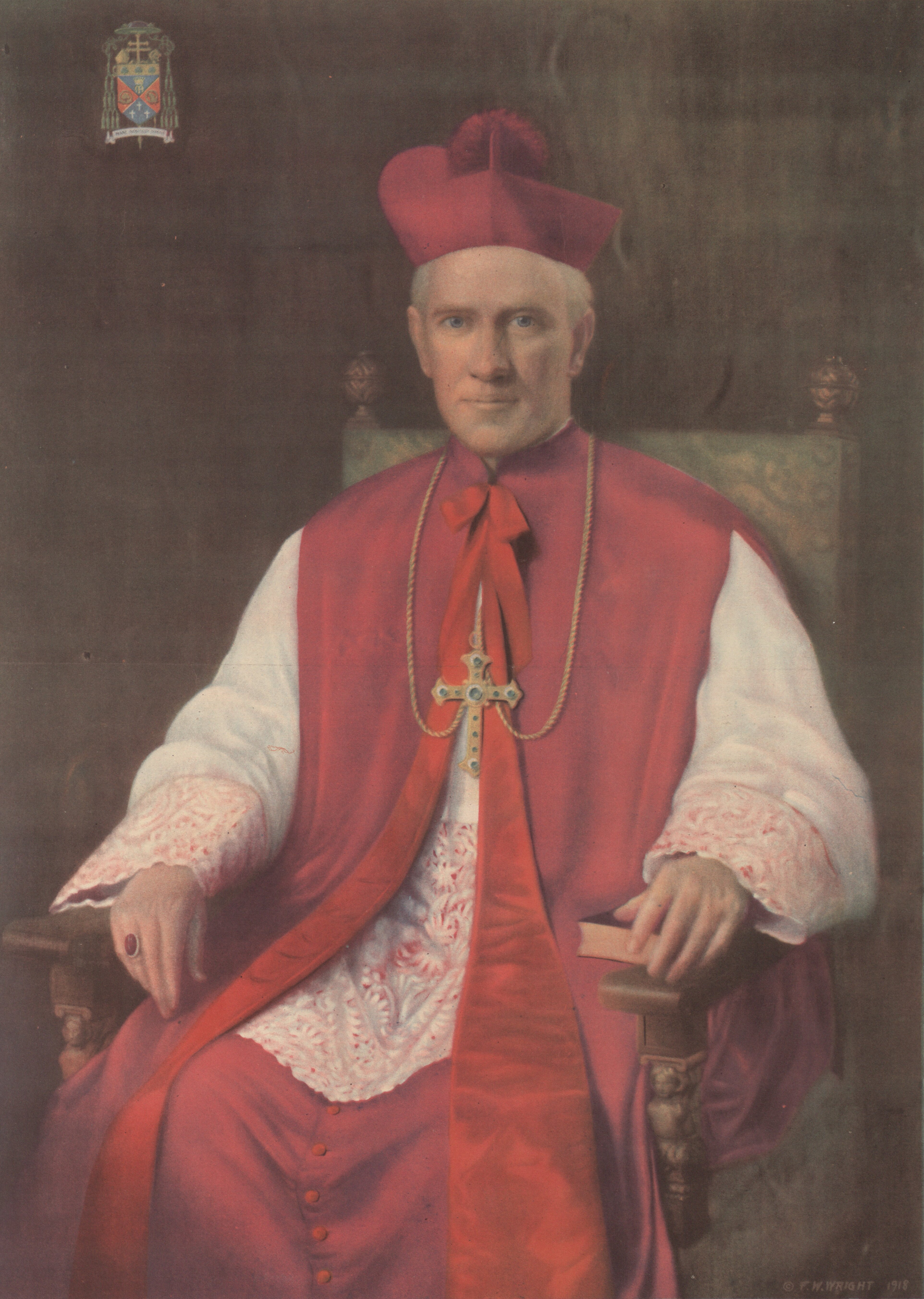
Archbishop Hayes (1918)

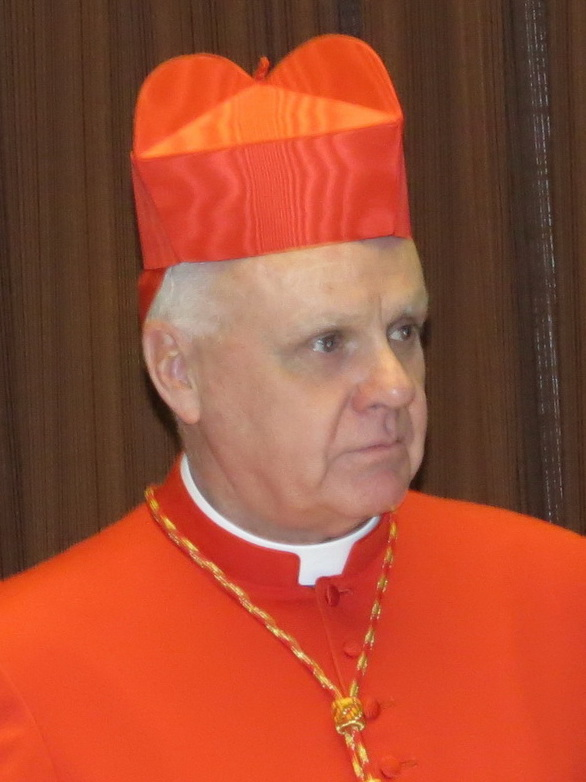
Cardinal O'Brien (2012)

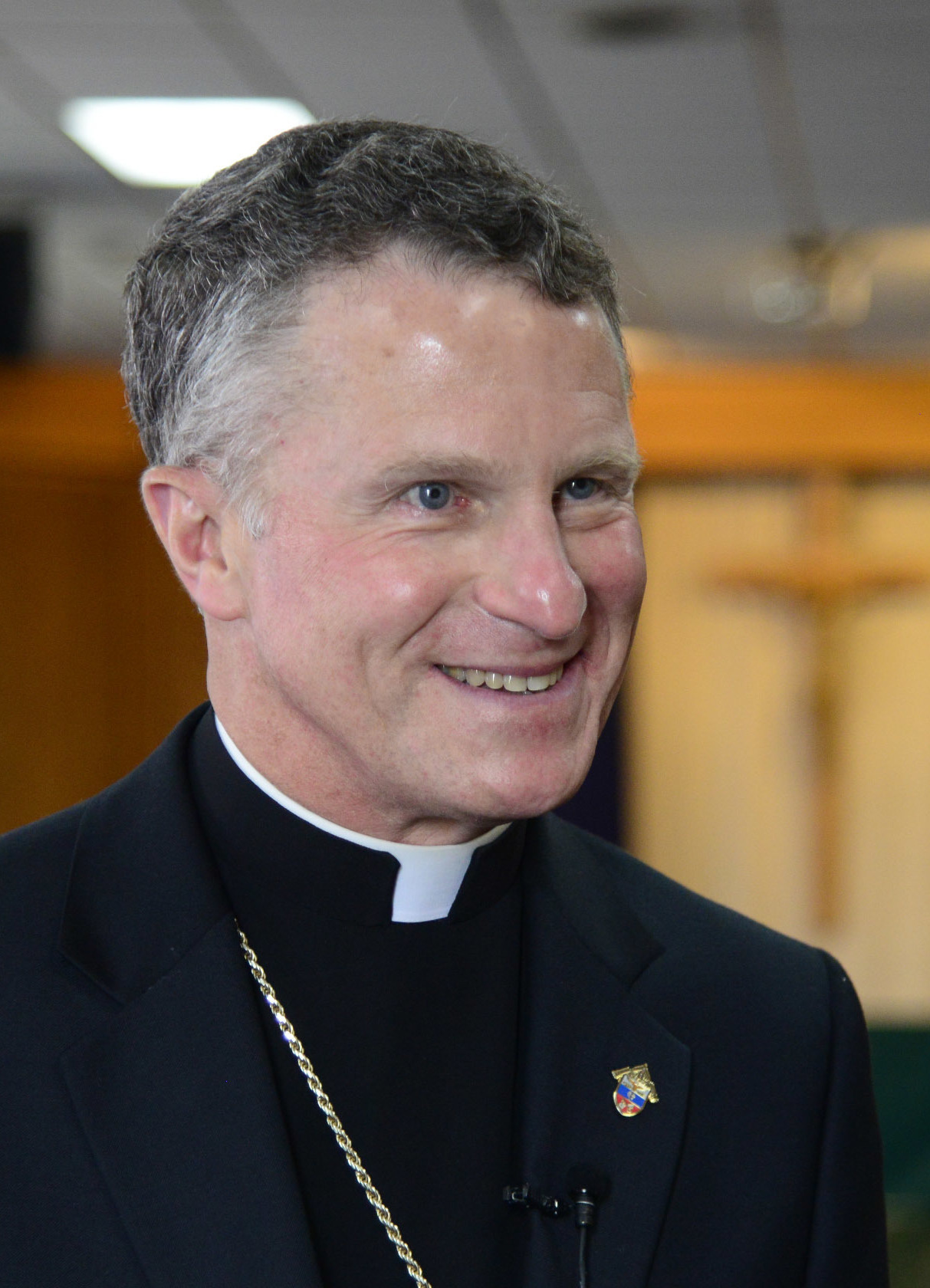
Archbishop Broglio (2015)

During the 19th century, individual Catholic dioceses sent priests to minister to Catholic soldiers and sailors on the battlefield without any central organizational structure. When the United States entered World War I in 1917, it had 25 Catholic military chaplains. By the end of the war, there were over 1,000 catholic chaplains.

To organize these efforts and establish jurisdiction, Pope Benedict XV in November 1917 erected a military diocese of the American armed forces. He appointed Auxiliary Bishop Patrick Hayes of the Archdiocese of New York as bishop of this new diocese. Hayes received the position because New York was the primary port of embarkation for U.S. troops leaving for France and was therefore a convenient contact point for Catholic chaplains accompanying them. During the war, Hayes established four vicariates within the United States and one for troops in Europe.

After Hayes was named archbishop of New York in 1918, he continued to run the military vicariate. When World War I ended in 1919, Hayes dissolved the overseas vicariate, but kept the four American vicariates. Hayes died in 1938. In 1939, Pope Pius XII named Archbishop Francis Spellman of New York to head the military diocese. During World War II and later, Spellman spent many Christmases with American troops in Japan, South Korea and Europe. Spellman died in 1967.

=== 1968 to 2000 ===
In 1968, a month after being named archbishop of New York by Pope Paul VI, Terence Cooke became the next head of the military diocese. To assist Cooke with the military diocese, the pope in 1975 appointed Bishop Joseph T. Ryan from the Archdiocese of Anchorage as a coadjutor bishop. Pope John Paul II in 1979 named a retired military chaplain, Rear Admiral John O'Connor as auxiliary bishop for the military diocese. In 1984, O'Connor became archbishop of New York.

On July 21, 1986, John Paul II decided to remove responsibility for the military services from the archbishop of New York. He instead erected a separate Archdiocese for the Military Services, USA (AMS). Ryan became its first archbishop. Ryan retired in 1991. The second archbishop of AMS was Auxiliary Bishop Joseph Dimino, a veteran of the US Navy Chaplain Corps. He was appointed by John Paul II in 1991.

In 1993, Dimino expressed his opposition to allowing LBGTQ persons to serve in the military to President Bill Clinton, saying that admitting gay men would have "disastrous consequences for all concerned." While archbishop, Dimino added his support to a campaign started by John Paul II to eliminate the use of land mines during warfare.

John Paul II named Auxiliary Bishop Edwin O'Brien of New York, a veteran of the US Army Chaplain Corps, as a coadjutor archbishop in 1997 to assist Dimino. When Dimino retired later in 1997 due to poor health, O'Brien automatically succeeded him as archbishop.

During his ten years as archbishop of the Military Services, O'Brien divided his time between visiting American troops and working with the Pontifical North American College in Rome. In 1993, he initiated the cause of canonization for Emil Kapaun, a US Army chaplain killed during the Korean War.

=== 2000 to present ===
In 2006, O'Brien noted that declining public support in the United States for the Iraq War was hurting morale among the troops, adding, "The news only shows cars being blown up, but the soldiers see hospitals being built and schools opening." By 2007, he believed that the status of US operations in Iraq "compels an assessment of our current circumstances and the continuing obligation of the Church to provide a moral framework for public discussion." In 2007, O'Brien became archbishop of the Archdiocese of Baltimore.

Pope Benedict XVI named Archbishop Timothy Broglio as head of the Archdiocese for the Military Services, USA in 2007. During his tenure, Broglio voiced opposition to the 2008 Affordable Care Act's contraceptive mandate and the repeal of the Don't Ask Don't Tell policy regarding LGBTQ individuals in the military.

In 2012, Catholic Extension approved a $56,000 two-year grant to AMS to support faith-formation programs for Catholics serving in the military. As of April 2013, about 25% of the U.S. armed forces were Catholic. As of 2017, the AMS had 208 priests on active duty serving approximately 1.8 million service members, family and others. In 2019, Broglio expressed his support for the Trump Administration's ban on transgender individuals serving in the military.

The Trump Administration in 2020 announced the termination of a contract to provide Catholic ministry to three naval stations in the San Diego areas of California as a cost-cutting measure. The contract was originally created because the Navy lacked sufficient chaplains to staff the installations. This move left them without any Catholic priests. However, after pushback from the AMS, the administration in September 2020 reinstated the contract.

== Bishops ==
=== Apostolic Vicar of the United States Armed Forces ===
1. Cardinal Patrick Joseph Hayes (1917–1938), concurrently served as Auxiliary Bishop of New York and later Archbishop of New York
2. Cardinal Francis Joseph Spellman (1939–1967), concurrently served as Archbishop of New York
3. Cardinal Terence James Cooke (1968–1983), concurrently served as Archbishop of New York

=== Apostolic Delegate for the United States Armed Forces ===
1. John Francis O'Hara (1939–1945), appointed Bishop of Buffalo and later Archbishop of Philadelphia (elevated to Cardinal in 1958)
2. William Richard Arnold (1945–1965)

=== Archbishop for the Military Services, USA ===
1. John Joseph Thomas Ryan (1985–1991)
2. Joseph Thomas Dimino (1991–1997)
3. Edwin Frederick O'Brien (1997–2007), appointed Archbishop of Baltimore and later pro-grand master and grand master of the Order of the Holy Sepulchre (elevated to cardinal in 2012)
4. Timothy P. Broglio (2008–present)

=== Coadjutor Archbishops ===
- John Joseph Thomas Ryan (1975–1985)
- Edwin Frederick O'Brien (1997)

=== Auxiliary Bishops ===
- William Tibertus McCarty (1943–1947), appointed Bishop of Rapid City
- James Henry Ambrose Griffiths (1949–1955), concurrently served as Auxiliary Bishop of New York
- Philip Joseph Furlong (1955–1971)
- William Joseph Moran (1965–1981)
- James Jerome Killeen (1975–1978)
- John Joseph O'Connor (1979–1983), appointed Bishop of Scranton and later Archbishop of New York (elevated to Cardinal in 1985)
- Lawrence Joyce Kenney (1983–1990)
- Angelo Thomas Acerra (1983–1990)
- Joseph Thomas Dimino (1983–1991), appointed Archbishop for the Military Services, USA
- Francis Xavier Roque (1983–2004)
- John Gavin Nolan (1987–1997)
- John Joseph Glynn (1991–2002)
- José de Jesús Madera Uribe (1991–2004)
- John Joseph Kaising (2000–2007)
- Joseph W. Estabrook (2004–2012)
- Richard Brendan Higgins (2004–2020)
- F. Richard Spencer (2010–2026)
- Neal James Buckon (2011–present)
- Robert J. Coyle (2013–2018), appointed Auxiliary Bishop of Rockville Centre
- Joseph L. Coffey (2019–present)
- William Muhm (2019–present)
- Gregg M. Caggianelli (2025–present)

== Seat ==
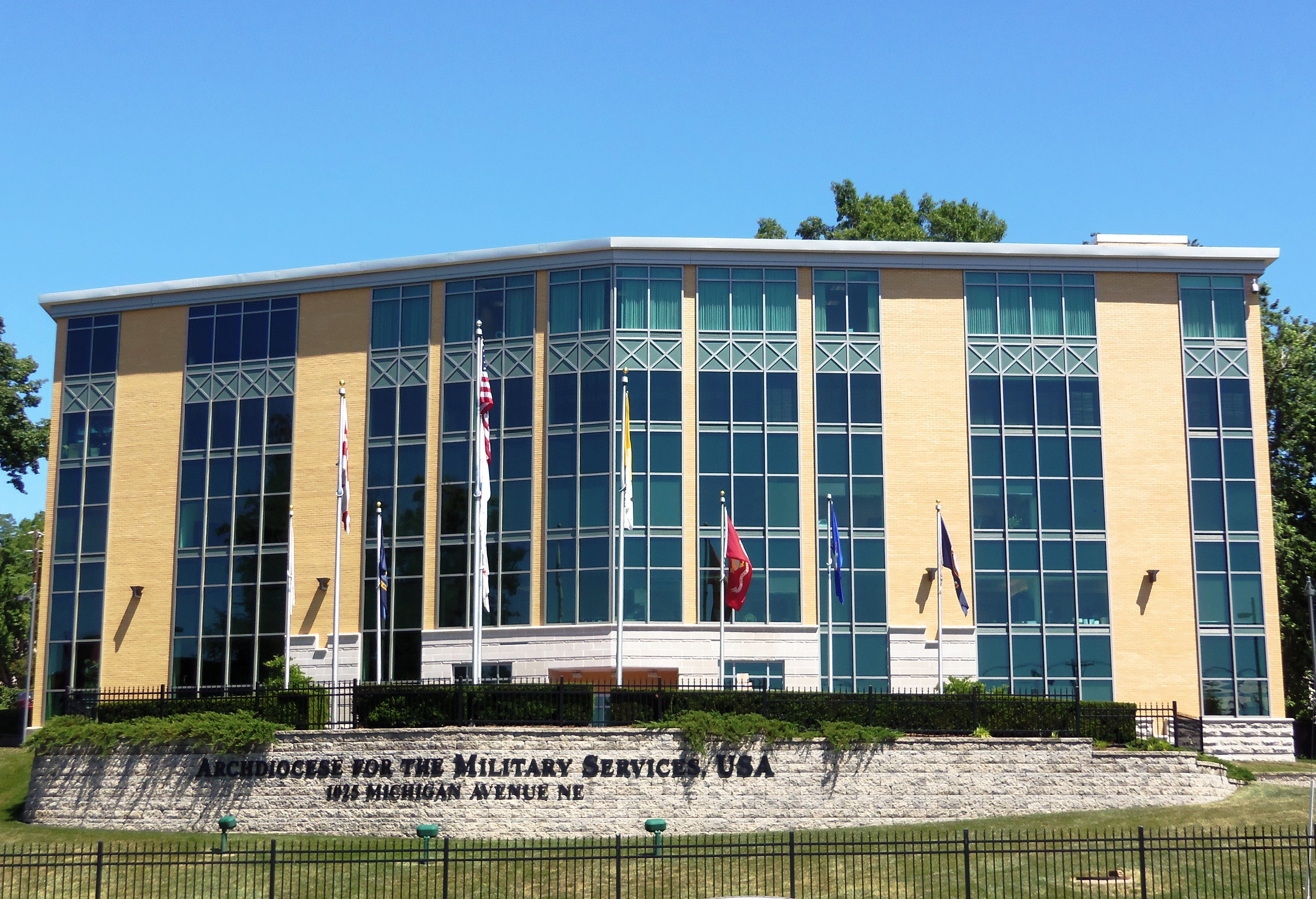
AMS Chancery, Washington, D.C. (2013)

The AMS chancery is located in the Brookland neighborhood of Washington, D.C., at 1025 Michigan Avenue Northeast. The AMS is the only U.S. diocese without a cathedral; it celebrates its major functions at the Basilica of the National Shrine of the Immaculate Conception in Washington.

== Noncombatant status ==
The Geneva Conventions state that chaplains are noncombatants: they do not have the right to participate directly in hostilities. They also state that captured chaplains are not considered prisoners of war and must be returned to their home nation unless retained to minister to prisoners of war.

== Reports of sexual abuse ==
=== Army ===
In 1985, Alvin L. Campbell from the Diocese of Springfield in Illinois plead guilty to sexual abuse of minor. A former military chaplain, Campbell had been reprimanded by the Army for committing "indecent homosexual acts with a child". After leaving the Army, he was allowed to transfer to the Diocese of Springfield, where he committed his charged crimes. He was sentenced to 14 years in prison. Campbell served seven years and was removed from public ministry by the AMS.

In 2000, Mark Matson was convicted of molesting a 13-year-old boy while serving at Tripler Army Medical Center in Honolulu, Hawaii. Matson received 20 years in prison.

In 2005, Gregory Arflack was sentenced to five years in prison after pleading guilty to sexually assaulting three Marines in Qatar.

=== Air Force ===
In 1991, Thomas Chleboski pled guilty to five counts of molesting a 13-year-old boy in 1989 and received a 20-year prison sentence.

Barry Ryan, a chaplain who served two years in prison for separate acts of sex abuse he committed in 2003, was removed from the AMS in 1995 after allegations surfaced that he committed acts of sexual abuse against a minor in 1994.

In April 2019, Colonel Arthur Perrault was convicted of sexually abusing an altar boy. The attacks took place at Kirtland Air Force Base, at an amusement park and a veterans' cemetery in New Mexico in the early 1990s. Perrault was serving in the Air National Guard when the abuse took place. Perrault disappeared in 1992. He was located in Morocco in 2018, which then expelled him to the United States. In September 2019, Perrault was convicted of sexual abuse crimes and sentenced to 30 years in prison.

=== Navy ===
Neal Destefano was convicted in 1994 of sexually molesting two unconscious Marines after plying them with alcohol. He was dismissed from the service and sentenced to five years in federal prison.

In 2007, John Thomas Lee pleaded guilty to forcible sodomy and other charges. While serving at the US Naval Academy at Quantico, Virginia, in 2004, he forced a midshipman to engage in oral sex. Court martialed in 2007, Lee was sentenced to two years in prison. After pleading guilty to one count of production of child pornography and one count of distribution of child pornography in 2015, Lee was sentenced to 30 years in prison.

== Notable chaplains ==
=== Mexican-American War ===
- John McElroy – One of the first two Catholic chaplains in the Army, later a founder of Boston College in Boston (1863).
- Anthony Rey – One of the first two Catholic chaplains in the Army, was vice president of Georgetown College in Washington (1845).

=== American Civil War ===
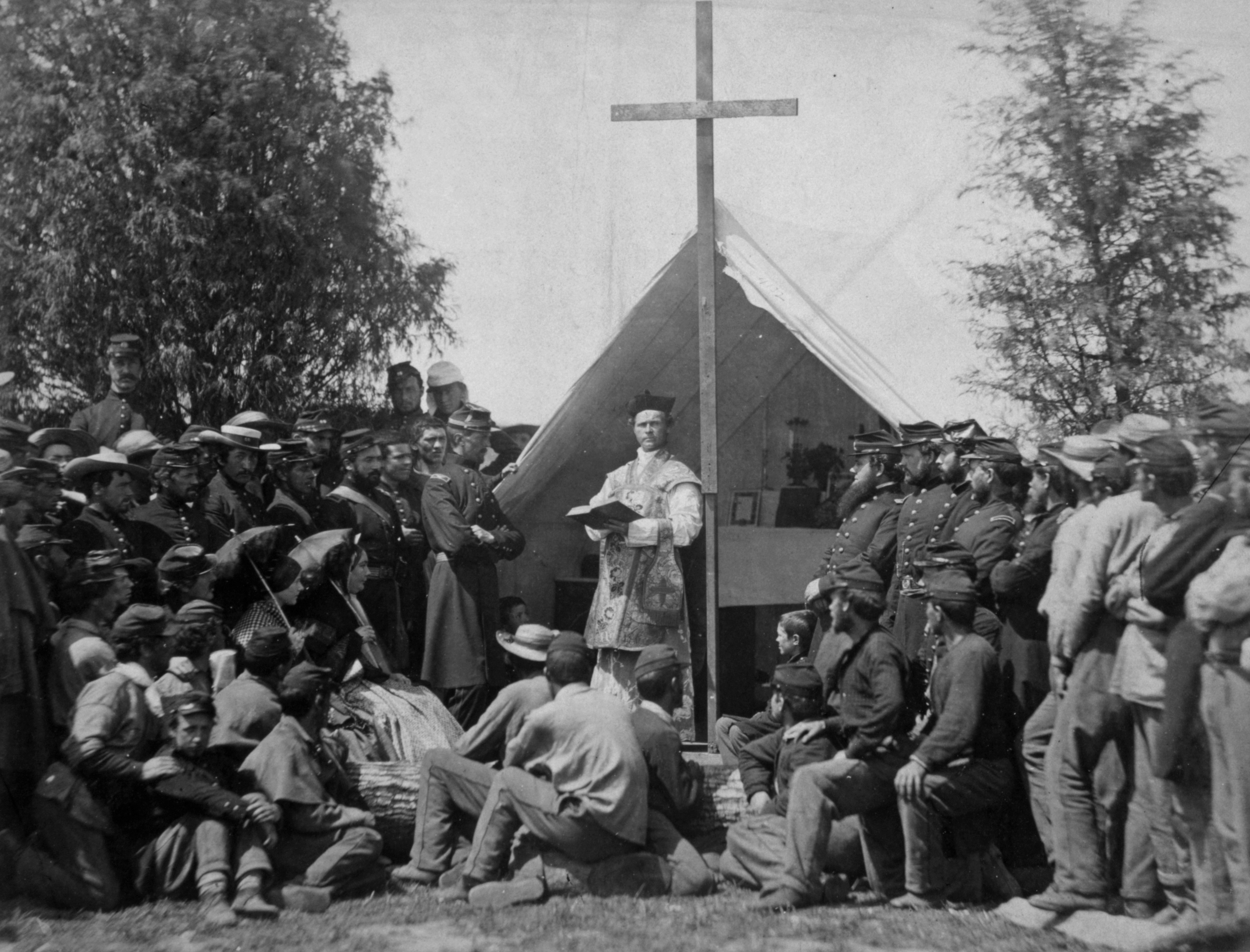
A Catholic Union Army chaplain celebrating mass during the American Civil War (1861–1865).

- William Corby – Served with the 88th New York Infantry of the Union Army. Famous for giving a general absolution to the Irish Brigade before the Battle of Gettysburg in Gettysburg, Pennsylvania, in 1863.
- John Ireland – Served with the 5th Minnesota Volunteer Infantry Regiment of the Union Army, later became archbishop of the Archdiocese of Saint Paul
- Bernard McQuaid – Served with the New Jersey Brigade of the Union Army at the 1862 Battle of Fredericksburg in Fredericksburg, Virginia. Later became bishop of the Diocese of Rochester and then archbishop of Chicago

=== Spanish-American War ===
- John P. Chidwick – Served with the Navy on the USS Maine when it sank in 1898 in the harbor of Havana, Cuba. He helped coordinate the burial of its sailors and their later reburials at Arlington National Cemetery in Arlington, Virginia.

=== World War I ===
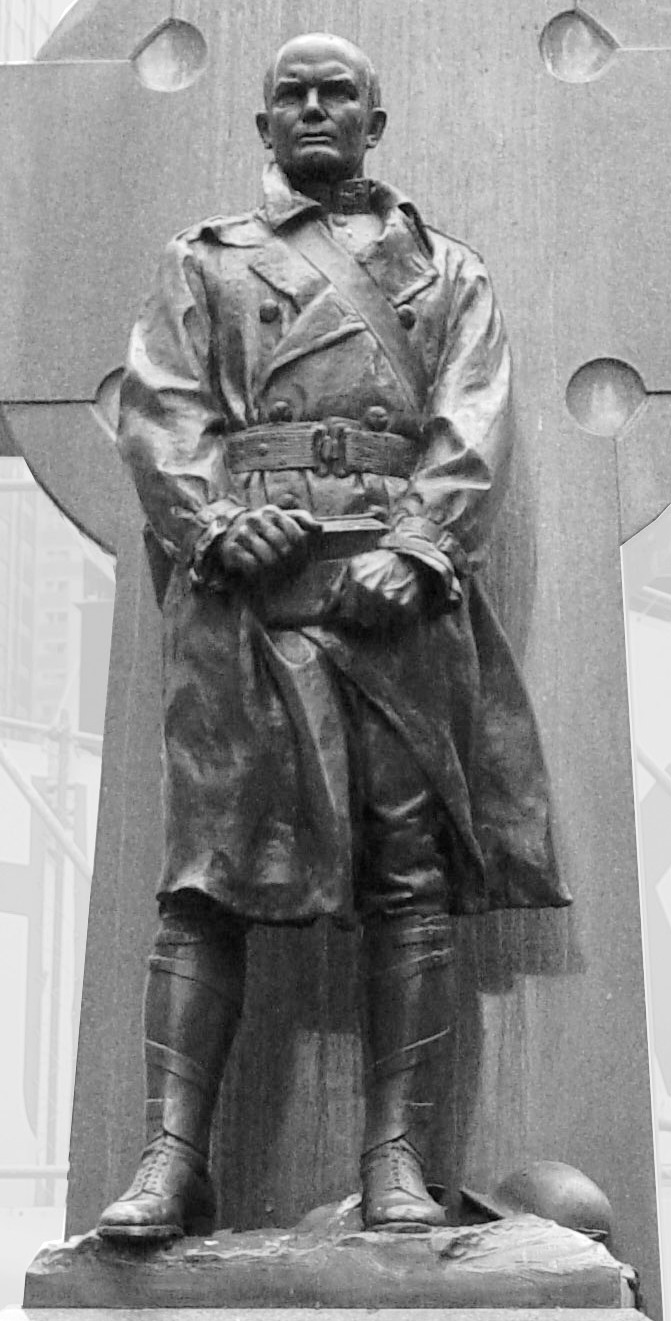
Duffy Monument, Times Square, New York (2007)

- John B. DeValles – Served with the Army 26th Infantry Division in France, made numerous trips between battle lines in combat to rescue wounded soldiers. Was awarded the French Croix de Guerre, the French Legion of Honor and the American Distinguished Service Cross.
- Francis P. Duffy – Served with the Army 69th Infantry Regiment in France. Helped rescue numerous wounded soldiers under enemy fire. Was awarded the Army Distinguished Service Medal, the American Conspicuous Service Cross, the Legion of Honor and the Croix de Guerre. Was the most decorated chaplain in Army history.
- John Joseph Mitty – Served at the U.S. Military Academy in West Point
- Colman O'Flaherty – Served with the Army 1st Infantry Division in France, was killed in action. Was posthumously awarded the Distinguished Service Cross.

=== World War II ===
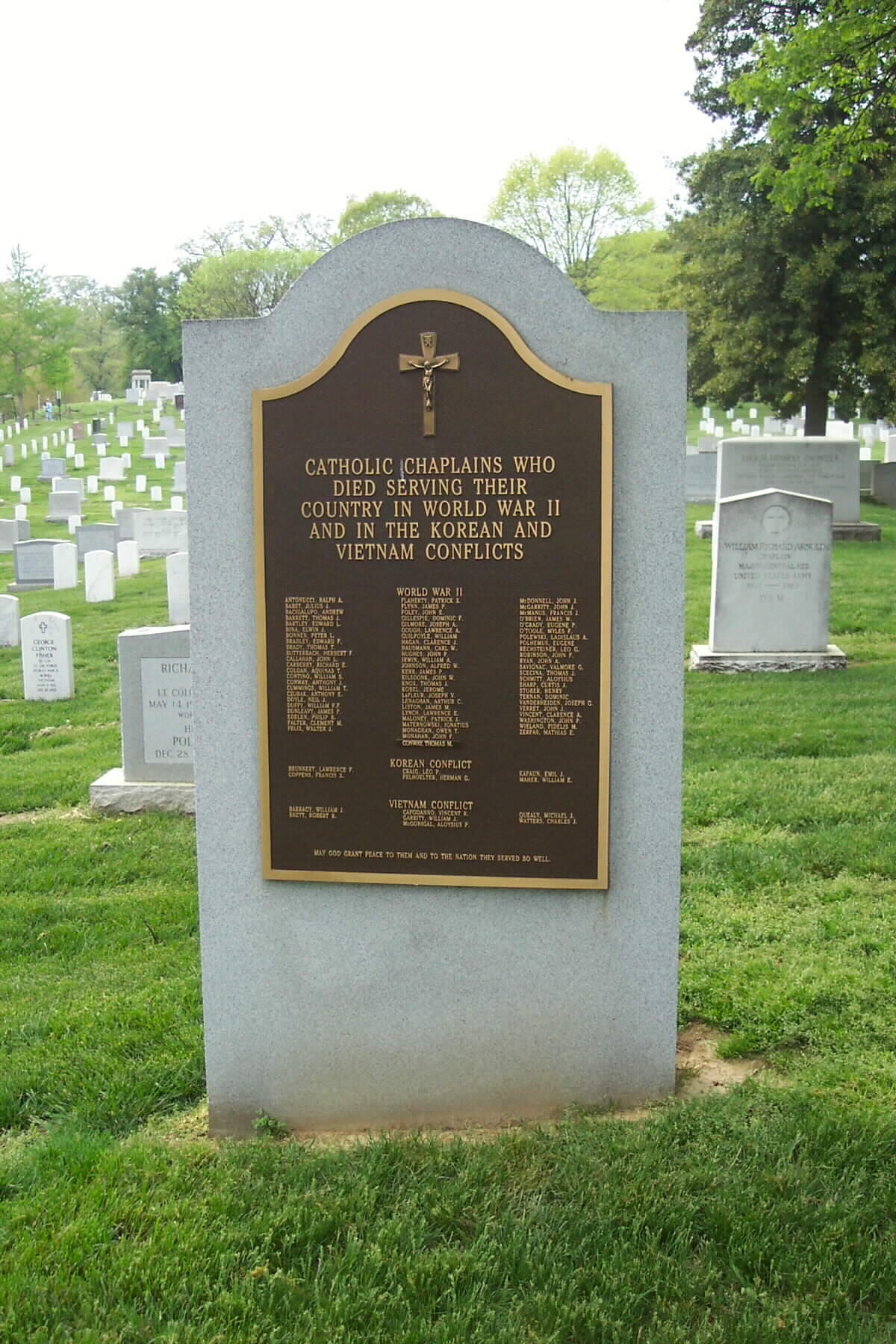
The Catholic chaplains' monument, Chaplains Hill, Arlington National Cemetery, Arlington, Virginia (2004)

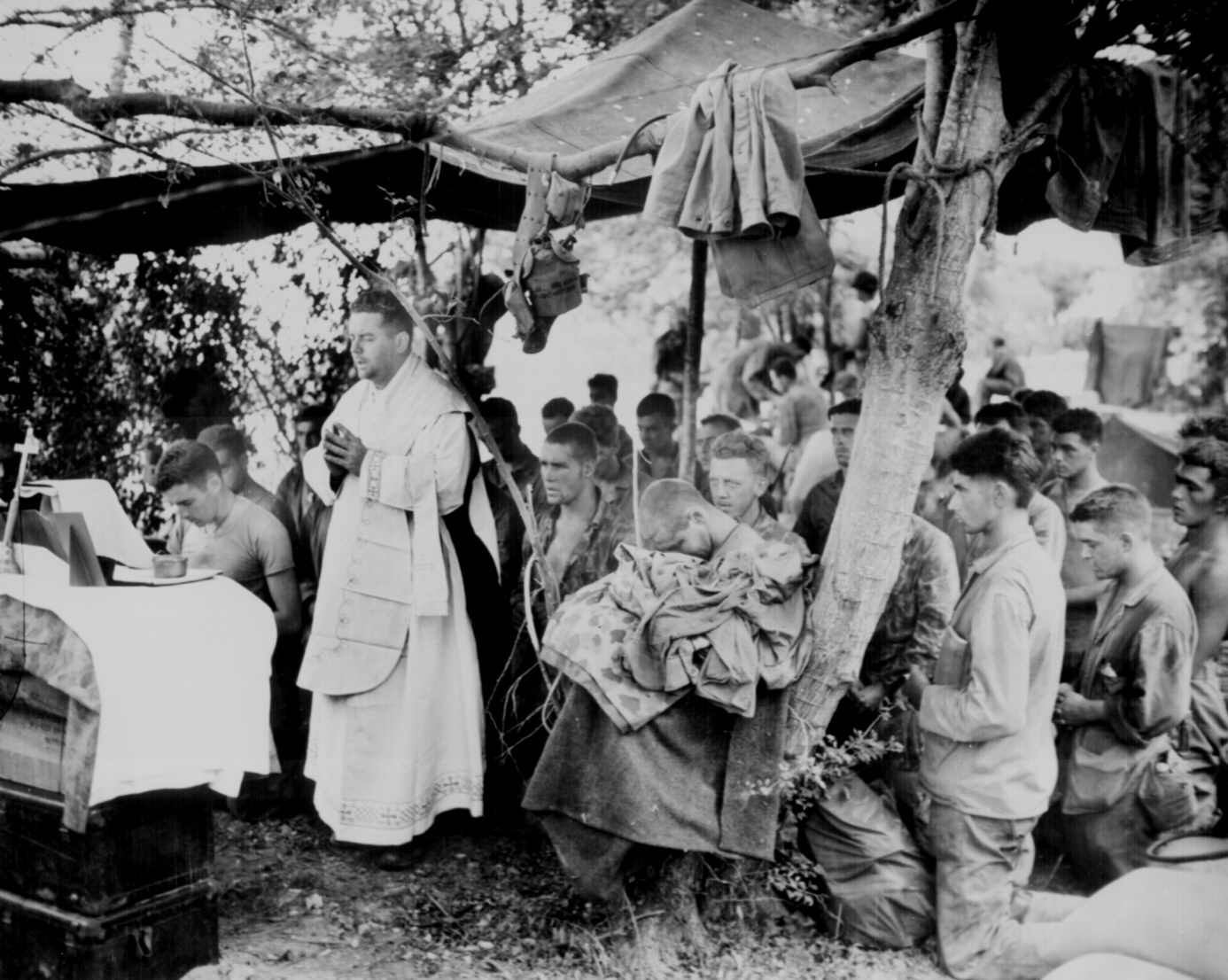
A US Navy Catholic chaplain celebrates mass for Marines on Saipan, June 1944, commemorating those who died during amphibious landings there.

- William R. Arnold – Served as Army chief of chaplains from 1937 to 1945, the first Catholic to hold that post. Later served as Apostolic Vicar for the U.S. Armed Forces
- Thomas J. Barrett – Served with the Army in the Burma Campaign, died in Burma in 1944.
- John T. Beyenka – Served with the 351st Infantry Regiment of the 88th Infantry Division in Italy. Worked with wounded, negotiated surrender of 700 German troops at the end of the war. Receive the Bronze Star
- Frederic P. Gehring – Served with the Navy during the Battle of Guadalcanal on Guadalcanal Island. Participated in a dangerous mission to evacuate missionaries. Awarded the Legion of Merit, the Navy and Marine Corps Medal, and the US Marine Corps Presidential Unit Citation
- Joseph Gilmore – Served with the Army's 88th Infantry Division in the Italian Campaign, killed in action in 1944.
- Philip M. Hannan – Served with the Army's 82nd Airborne Division in the Ardennes Offensive in Belgium. Later appointed archbishop of the Archdiocese of New Orleans
- Albert J. Hoffman – Served with the Army in the 133rd Infantry Regiment, rescuing wounded soldiers during the Battle of Monte Cassino in Italy. Was awarded the Silver Star, the Purple Heart and the Distinguished Service Cross. Later became dean of Loras College in Dubuque, Iowa.
- Joseph T. O'Callahan – Served with the Navy on the USS Franklin (CV-13) in the Pacific. Performed heroic actions during the 1945 Japanese bombing of the ship. Was awarded the Medal of Honor.
- James Hugh O'Neill – Served with General George Patton and the US 3rd Army in Europe, wrote the famous weather prayer during the 1944 to 1945 Ardennes Offensive in Belgium. Later served as deputy chief of chaplains of the United States Army
- Joseph T. Ryan – Served with the Navy at the 1945 Battle of Okinawa, was decorated for bravery. Appointed as the first archbishop of the Archdiocese for the Military Services, USA.
- Aloysius H. Schmitt – Served with Navy on the USS Oklahoma during the 1941 Pearl Harbor attack. Exhibited heroism in helping multiple sailors escape a flooding compartment before drownings. Was the first American chaplain to die in World War II. Awarded the Silver Star and other commendations.
- John P. Washington – Served with the Army, exhibited heroism in the 1942 sinking of the troop transport ship SS Dorchester in the Atlantic Ocean. Known as one of the Four Chaplains who gave up their life jackets to others, he died on the ship.
- Joseph Verbis Lafleur – Served with Army in the 1942 Battle of Corregidor in the Philippines, refused evacuation so that he could care for the wounded, died in ship sinking. Recipient of the Distinguished Service Cross, the Bronze Star, and the Purple Heart.

=== Korean conflict ===
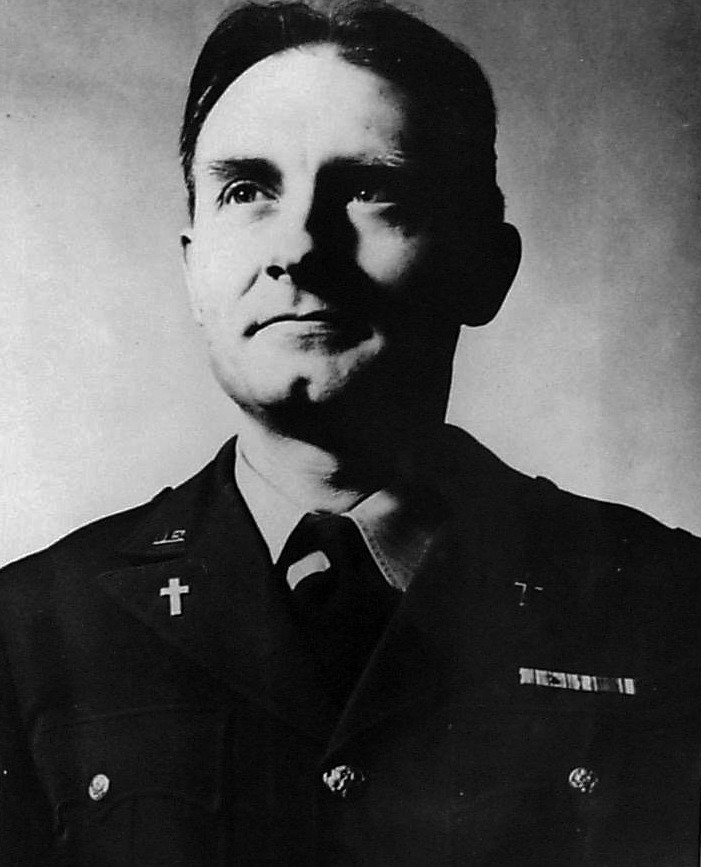
Kapuan (between 1944 and 1951

- Herman G. Felhoelter – Served with the Army 24th Infantry Division in Korea. Executed by North Korean Army troops while ministering to wounded soldiers. Was posthumously awarded the Distinguished Service Cross.
- Emil J. Kapaun – Served with the Army 1st Cavalry Division in Korea, captured by People's Liberation Army at the 1950 Battle of Unsan. Continued his ministry among American prisoners of war, died in captivity in 1951; posthumously awarded the Medal of Honor in 2013. Declared a Servant of God by the Vatican in 1993 and Venerable in 2025.
- John J. O'Connor – Served with the Navy. Later served as Navy chief of chaplains from 1975 to 1979, was auxiliary bishop of the Military Vicariate, 1979 to 1983, and archbishop of New York.

=== Cold War (pre-Vietnam) ===
- Terence P. Finnegan – Served as Air Force chief of chaplains from 1958 to 1962, first Catholic to hold that position
- Patrick J. Ryan – Served as Army chief of chaplains from 1954 to 1958

=== Vietnam War ===
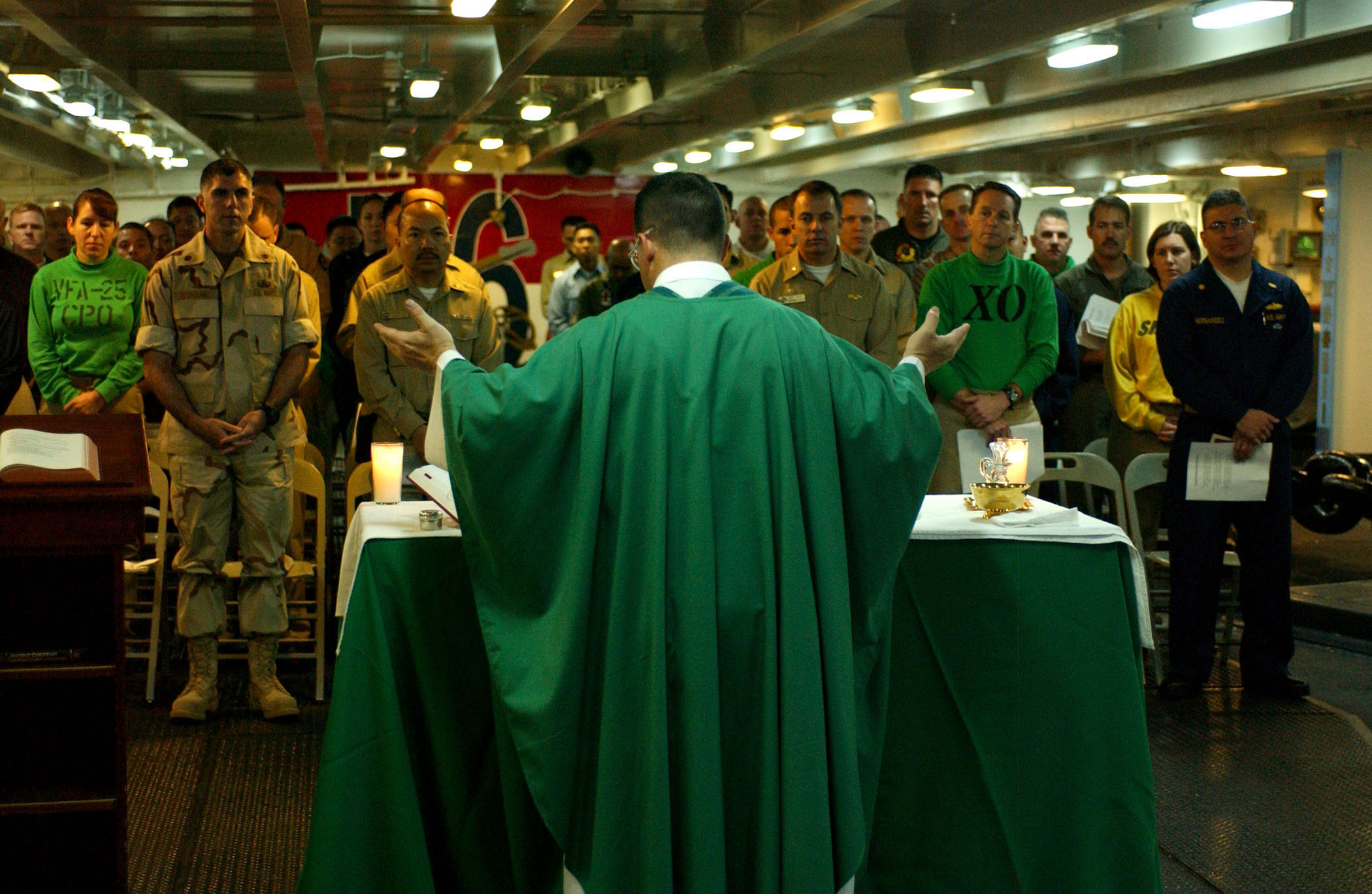
U.S. Navy Chaplain Kenneth Medve celebrates mass on board the USS Ronald Reagan (2006)

- Vincent R. Capodanno – Served with the Navy, killed in action in 1967 in South Vietnam while attempted to rescue wounded men under enemy fire. Awarded the Medal of Honor posthumously.
- Edwin R. Chess – Served as Air Force chief of chaplains from 1966 to 1970
- John F. Laboon Jr. – Served with the Navy in South Vietnam, decorated for bravery in combat
- Charles Liteky – Served with the Army 199th Infantry Brigade in South Vietnam. Exhibiting heroism in 1967 in rescuing 20 wounded soldiers while under enemy fire. Was awarded the Medal of Honor.
- Francis L. Sampson – Served as the Army chief of chaplains from 1967 to 1971
- Charles J. Watters – Served with the Army in South Vietnam, killed in action during the 1967 Battle of Dak To. Awarded the Medal of Honor posthumously for heroic actions saving the wounded.

=== Cold War (post-Vietnam) ===
- John A. Collins – Served as the Air Force chief of chaplains from 1982 to 1985
- William Joseph Dendinger – Served as the Air Force chief of chaplains from 1997 to 2001.
- Patrick J. Hessian – Served as the Army chief of chaplains from 1982 to 1986
- John P. McDonough – Served as the Air Force chief of chaplains from 1988 to 1991
- Henry J. Meade – Served as the Air Force chief of chaplains from 1974 to 1978
- Donald W. Shea – Served as the Army chief of chaplains from 1994 to 1999
- Arthur S. Thomas – Served as the Air Force chief of chaplains from 1995 to 1997

=== Iraq War/War on Terror ===
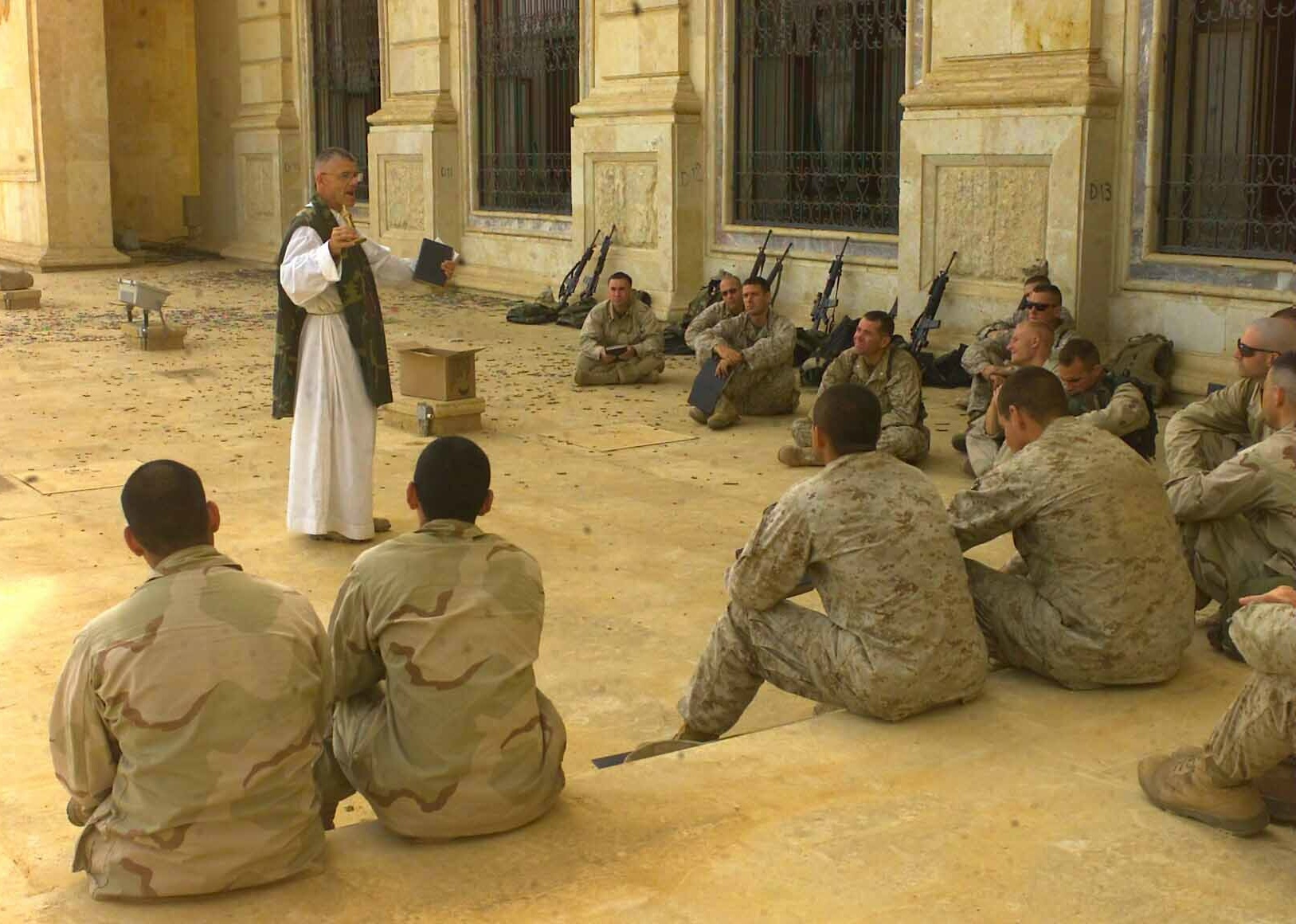
A Catholic chaplain ministers to American Marines and sailors in Tikrit, Iraq (2003)

- Donald L. Rutherford – Served as the Army chief of chaplains from 2011 to 2015
- H. Timothy Vakoc – Served with the Army 2nd Infantry Division in Iraq. Was only American chaplain to die from wounds during the Iraq War.

== Catholic chaplains in popular culture ==
- Fighting Spirit: A Combat Chaplain's Journey (2024), a documentary film about former Protestant Army Chaplain Justin Roberts that discusses the courage of Emil Kapuan
- MASH (film) (1970), with René Auberjonois portraying the fictional Father John Mulcahy
- M*A*S*H (TV series) (1972 to 1983), with William Christopher portraying Mulcahy
- The Fighting 69th (1940), film with Pat O'Brien portraying Francis Duffy
- The Four Chaplains: Sacrifice at Sea (2004), TV movie about John P. Washington and the three other heroic chaplains

== See also ==
- Chaplain of the Coast Guard
- Chaplain of the United States Marine Corps
- Chaplain's Medal for Heroism
- International Military Chiefs of Chaplains Conference
- United States Air Force Chaplain Corps
- United States Army Chaplain Corps
- United States military chaplains
- United States Navy Chaplain Corps
