= John Joseph Glynn =

American Roman Catholic priest and bishop

John Joseph Glynn (August 6, 1926 – August 23, 2004) was a Catholic American bishop who served the Archdiocese for the Military Services.

== Biography ==
Born in Boston, Massachusetts, he was ordained a priest for the Archdiocese of Boston on April 11, 1951.

Glynn was appointed auxiliary bishop of the Roman Catholic Archdiocese for the Military Services, USA on December 10, 1991, and was consecrated on January 6, 1992.

Bishop Glynn retired on August 13, 2002.

== See also ==
- Catholic Church hierarchy
- Catholic Church in the United States
- Historical list of the Catholic bishops of the United States
- Insignia of chaplain schools in the United States military
- List of Catholic bishops of the United States
- List of Catholic bishops of the United States: military service
- Lists of patriarchs, archbishops, and bishops
- Military chaplain
- Religious symbolism in the United States military
- United States military chaplains

== Episcopal succession ==
Catholic Church titles
Preceded by –	Auxiliary Bishop for the Military Services, USA; 1991 – 2002	Succeeded by –
