= Francis Xavier Roque =

American Roman Catholic priest and bishop (1928–2019)

His Excellency, The Most Reverend Francis Xavier Roque
- Auxiliary Bishop Emeritus of the Military Services, USA; Titular Bishop of Bagai
- Archdiocese: Military Services, USA
- Appointed: March 29, 1983
- Installed: May 10, 1983
- Term ended: September 15, 2004
- Other post: Titular Bishop of Bagai

Orders
- Ordination: September 19, 1953
- Consecration: May 10, 1983 by Terence Cooke, Joseph T. Ryan, and Louis Edward Gelineau

Personal details
- Born: October 9, 1928 Providence, Rhode Island, United States
- Died: September 12, 2019 (aged 90) Pawtucket, Rhode Island, United States

Styles of Francis Xavier Roque
- Reference style: His Excellency; The Most Reverend
- Spoken style: Your Excellency
- Religious style: Bishop

Francis Xavier Roque (October 9, 1928 – September 12, 2019) was an American Roman Catholic bishop who served the Archdiocese for the Military Services.

== Biography ==
Born in Providence, Rhode Island, Roque was ordained to the priesthood on September 19, 1953, for the Roman Catholic Diocese of Providence.

On May 29, 1983, he was named titular bishop of Bagai and auxiliary bishop of the Roman Catholic Archdiocese for the Military Services, USA and was consecrated bishop on May 10, 1983.

Bishop Roque retired on September 15, 2004.

== See also ==
- Catholic Church hierarchy
- Catholic Church in the United States
- Historical list of the Catholic bishops of the United States
- Insignia of chaplain schools in the United States military
- List of Catholic bishops of the United States
- List of Catholic bishops of the United States: military service
- Lists of patriarchs, archbishops, and bishops
- Military chaplain
- Religious symbolism in the United States military
- United States military chaplains

== Episcopal succession ==
Catholic Church titles
Preceded by –	Auxiliary Bishop for the Military Services, USA; 1983 – 2004	Succeeded by –
