= Joseph W. Estabrook =

American Roman Catholic chaplain

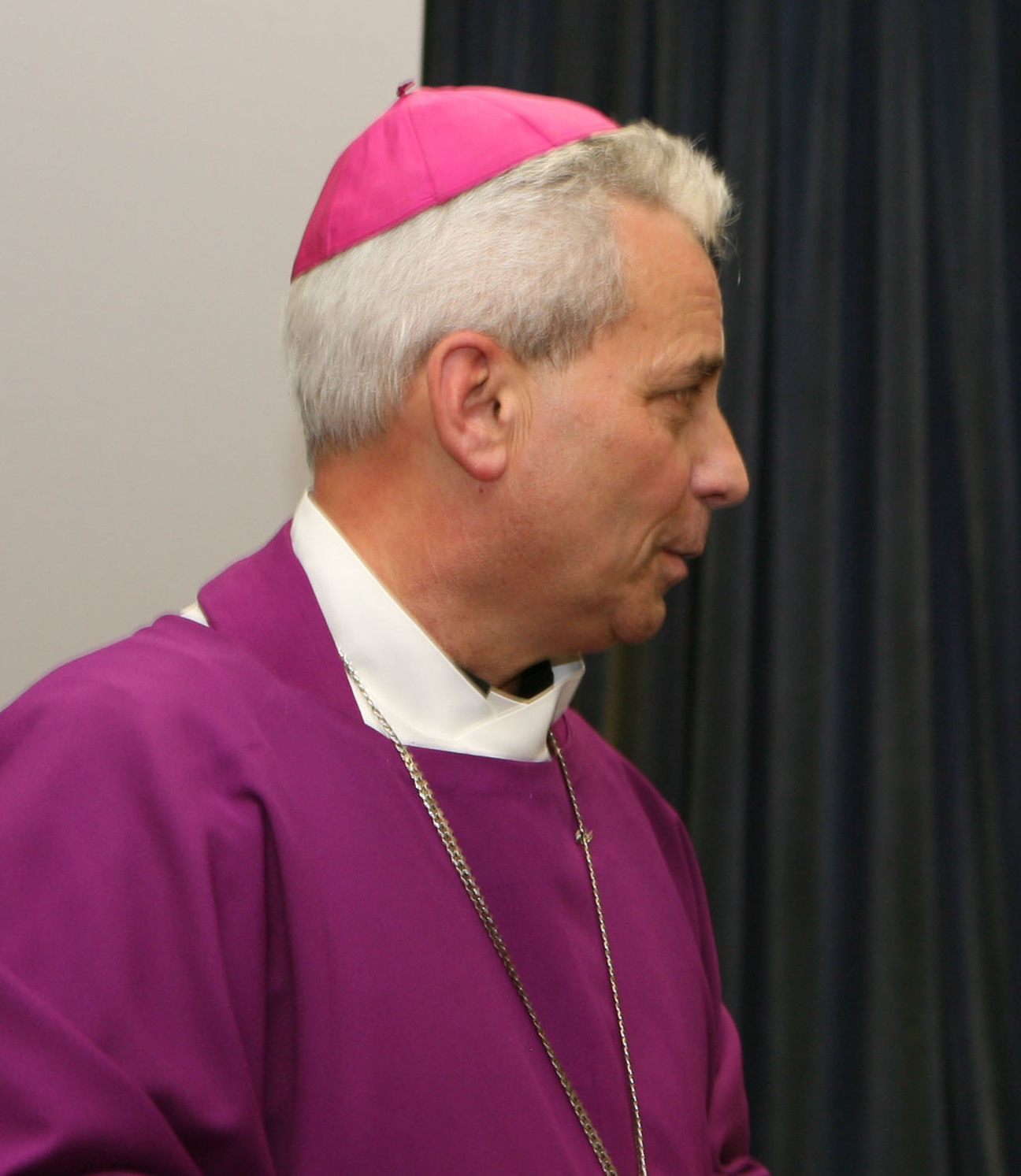
Joseph W. Estabrook in 2008

Joseph Walter Estabrook (May 19, 1944 – February 4, 2012) was an American Catholic prelate who served as an auxiliary bishop in the Archdiocese for the Military Services from 2004 to 2012.

== Biography ==
=== Early life and education ===
Joseph Estabrook attended St. Bonaventure University (in Olean, New York), the Seminary of Christ the King (in East Aurora, New York), where he earned a Master's degree in Divinity, and the Jesuit School Of Theology (Berkeley, California).

=== Ordination and ministry ===
Estabrook was ordained to the priesthood by Bishop Edwin Broderick on May 30, 1969. He then served as associate pastor at St. Vincent de Paul Parish in Albany from 1969-1973, a member of the Priests Senate Committee from 1969-1972, Vice President of the Priests Senate Committee from 1971-1972 and as director of the Diocesan Family Life Bureau from 1972 to 1977.

=== Military chaplain ===
Estabrook entered the chaplaincy of the United States Navy on July 4, 1977, and then served as chaplain at the Naval Hospital in Jacksonville, Florida until 1978. He served at Naval Station Mayport (1978–1980) and at Marine Corps Base Quantico (1980–1982) before studying at the Armed Forces Staff College in Norfolk, Virginia. He worked in recruitment and endorsing at the Navy Chief of Chaplains Office from 1983 to 1986.

Estabrook was a chaplain aboard the USS Carl Vinson from 1986 to 1988, whence he was transferred to the US Naval Hospital in Oakland, California. From 1988 to 1989, he studied ethics at the Jesuit School of Theology at Berkeley. He was a chaplain at the Naval Air Station Sigonella (1989–1991) and a basic course officer at the Navy Chaplain School aboard Naval Education and Training Command in Newport, Rhode Island (1991–1994) before serving as Executive Assistant to the Navy Chief of Chaplains at the Department of Navy from 1994 to 1997. He served as U.S. Pacific Fleet Chaplain aboard Naval Station Pearl Harbor from 1997 to 2000, and served at Marine Corps Base Kaneohe Bay, Hawaii from 2000 to 2004.

=== Auxiliary Bishop for the Military Services ===
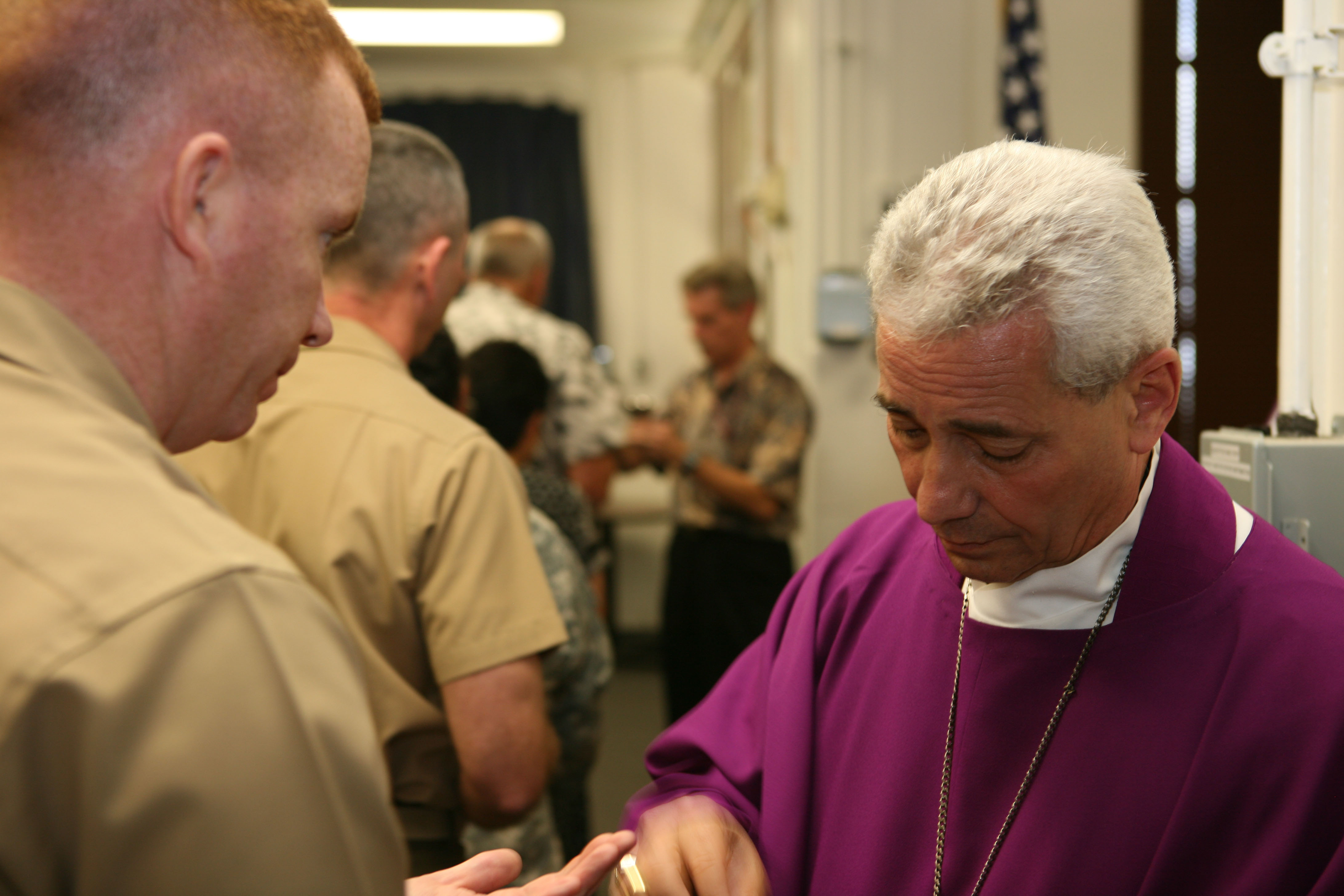
Most Reverend Joseph W. Estabrook, Auxiliary Bishop of the Archdiocese for the Military Services, offers communion during Roman Catholic mass at Camp H. M. Smith, Feb. 15, 2008

On May 7, 2004, Estabrook was appointed Auxiliary Bishop of the Armed Forces and Titular Bishop of Flenucleta by Pope John Paul II. He received his episcopal consecration on the following July 3 from Archbishop Edwin O'Brien, with Bishops Howard Hubbard and William Weigand serving as co-consecrators, at the Basilica of the National Shrine of the Immaculate Conception.

He retired from the Navy on June 17, 2004, as Captain. He was awarded two Meritorious Service Medals and Navy Commendation Medals, and three Legion of Merit Medals. He was Fourth Degree Knight of Columbus and a Knight of the Holy Sepulchre.

Estabrook was accused in a lawsuit filed in August 2019 of abuse of a student, ages 14-16, at St. Vincent de Paul parish,1969-71.

Estabrook died in Houston, Texas on February 4, 2012, aged 67.

== See also ==
- Catholic Church hierarchy
- Catholic Church in the United States
- Historical list of the Catholic bishops of the United States
- Insignia of chaplain schools in the United States military
- List of Catholic bishops of the United States
- List of Catholic bishops of the United States: military service
- Lists of patriarchs, archbishops, and bishops
- Military chaplain
- Religious symbolism in the United States military
- United States military chaplains
- United States Navy Chaplain Corps

== Episcopal succession ==
Catholic Church titles
Preceded by –	Auxiliary Bishop for the Military Services, USA; 2004 – 2012	Succeeded by –
