= William Joseph Moran =

United States Army chaplain (1906–1996)

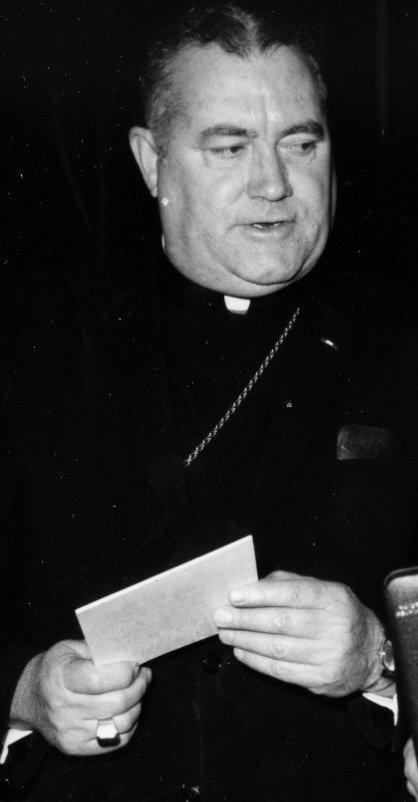
- Born: January 15, 1906; San Francisco, California, U.S.
- Died: August 23, 1996 (aged 90); San Rafael, California, U.S.
- Military career
- Allegiance: United States
- Branch: United States Army
- Rank: Brigadier General
- Conflicts: World War II; Korean War
- Awards: Purple Heart (2)

William Joseph Moran (January 15, 1906 – August 23, 1996) was a Roman Catholic chaplain who served as the 7th Deputy Chief of Chaplains of the United States Army from 1958 to 1966 before serving as the bishop of the Archdiocese for Military Services.

== Biography ==
Born in San Francisco, California, Moran was ordained to the priesthood on June 20, 1931, for the Roman Catholic Archdiocese of San Francisco, California.

On September 15, 1965, Moran was appointed titular bishop of Centuria and auxiliary bishop of the Roman Catholic Archdiocese for the Military Services, USA and was consecrated on December 13, 1965. Moran retired on January 15, 1981.

== See also ==
- Catholic Church hierarchy
- Catholic Church in the United States
- Historical list of the Catholic bishops of the United States
- Insignia of chaplain schools in the United States military
- List of Catholic bishops of the United States
- List of Catholic bishops of the United States: military service
- Lists of patriarchs, archbishops, and bishops
- Military chaplain
- Religious symbolism in the United States military
- United States military chaplains

Catholic Church titles
Preceded by –	Auxiliary Bishop for the Military Services, USA; 1965–1981	Succeeded by –
