= Angelo Thomas Acerra =

American Roman Catholic priest and bishop

His Excellency Angelo Thomas Acerra
- Auxiliary Bishop for the Military Services
- See: Military Services
- Appointed: September 29, 1983
- Term ended: July 26, 1990

Orders
- Ordination: May 20, 1950
- Consecration: November 29, 1983 by Joseph T. Ryan

Personal details
- Born: November 7, 1925 Memphis, Tennessee, U.S.
- Died: July 26, 1990 (aged 64) Alexandria, Virginia, U.S.
- Denomination: Roman Catholic

Angelo Thomas Accera O.S.B. (November 7, 1925 – July 26, 1990) was a Catholic bishop who served the Archdiocese for the Military Services.

== Biography ==
Born in Memphis, Tennessee, Accera entered the Benedictine order in 1944 at St. Bernard Abbey in Cullman, Alabama. He attended St. Benedict's College and was ordained to the priesthood on May 20, 1950. He obtained advanced degrees in canon law from Catholic University and the "Angelicum" in Rome. He was a member of the Catholic Theological Society of America.

He served for twenty years as a chaplain for the U.S. Air Force, retiring as a colonel. On September 29, 1983, Accerra was appointed titular bishop of Lete and auxiliary bishop of the Military Vicariate and was consecrated bishop on November 29, 1983. He was a member of the United States Conference of Catholic Bishops Ad Hoc Committee on the Moral Evaluation of Deterrence. Bishop Acerra died July 26, 1990, at his home in Alexandria, Virginia of lung cancer.

== See also ==
- Historical list of the Catholic bishops of the United States
- Insignia of chaplain schools in the United States military
- List of Catholic bishops of the United States: military service
- Lists of patriarchs, archbishops, and bishops
- Military chaplain
- Religious symbolism in the United States military
- United States military chaplains
