= James Jerome Killeen =

American Roman Catholic priest and bishop

James Jerome Killeen (July 17, 1917 – September 8, 1978) was a Roman Catholic bishop who served the Archdiocese for the Military Services.

== Biography ==
Born in New York City, Killeen was ordained to the priesthood on May 30, 1947. On November 7, 1975, Killeen was named titular bishop of Vamilla and auxiliary bishop of the Roman Catholic Archdiocese for the Military Services, USA.

Prior to being named a bishop, he had served as Chief of Chaplains of the United States Navy. He was consecrated bishop on December 13, 1975, and died in office.

== See also ==
- Catholic Church hierarchy
- Catholic Church in the United States
- Historical list of the Catholic bishops of the United States
- Insignia of chaplain schools in the United States military
- List of Catholic bishops of the United States
- List of Catholic bishops of the United States: military service
- Lists of patriarchs, archbishops, and bishops
- Military chaplain
- Religious symbolism in the United States military
- United States military chaplains
- United States Navy Chaplain Corps

== Episcopal succession ==
Catholic Church titles
Preceded by –	Auxiliary Bishop for the Military Services, USA; 1975 – 1978	Succeeded by –
