= Lawrence Joyce Kenney =

American Roman Catholic priest and bishop

Lawrence Joyce Kenney (August 30, 1930 – August 30, 1990) was a Roman Catholic bishop serving the Archdiocese for the Military Services.

== Biography ==
Born in New Rochelle, New York, Kenney was ordained to the priesthood on June 2, 1956.

On March 25, 1983, Kenney was appointed titular bishop of Hólar and auxiliary bishop of the Roman Catholic Archdiocese for the Military Services, USA. He was consecrated bishop on May 10, 1983, and died in office.

== See also ==
- Catholic Church hierarchy
- Catholic Church in the United States
- Historical list of the Catholic bishops of the United States
- Insignia of chaplain schools in the United States military
- List of Catholic bishops of the United States
- List of Catholic bishops of the United States: military service
- Lists of patriarchs, archbishops, and bishops
- Military chaplain
- Religious symbolism in the United States military
- United States military chaplains

== Episcopal succession ==
Catholic Church titles
Preceded by –	Auxiliary Bishop for the Military Services, USA; 1983 – 1990	Succeeded by –
