= Philip Joseph Furlong =

American Roman Catholic priest and bishop

- Auxiliary Bishop of the United States Military Vicariate
- In office: 1956–1971

Orders
- Ordination: May 18, 1918

Personal details
- Born: September 8, 1892 New York City
- Died: April 13, 1989 (aged 96) Rectory of St. Thomas More
- Denomination: Roman Catholic
- Education: St. Joseph's Seminary; Fordham University

Philip J. Furlong (September 8, 1892 – April 13, 1989) was a Catholic bishop, serving as Auxiliary Bishop of the United States Military Vicariate from 1956 to 1971.

== Biography ==
Born in New York City on September 8, 1892, Furlong attended Cathedral College and St. Joseph's Seminary in Yonkers, NY and was ordained a priest of the Archdiocese of New York on May 18, 1918. After receiving a doctorate in philosophy from Fordham University, in 1920 Furlong became a professor of history at Cathedral College and eventually dean and president from 1938 to 1941. At its completion in 1941 Furlong became the first principal of Cardinal Hayes High School in the Bronx until 1945 and served as secretary of education for the New York archdiocese. In 1950, he was named pastor of St. Thomas More in Manhattan, a post he held until retiring in 1969.

Furlong was active in many educational and historical societies. Catholic elementary school students across the United States learned American history from his eight-volume textbook series, The Furlong History Series, written in the 1920s through 1940s. He was a national chaplain for the Girl Scouts from 1946 to 1955.

Furlong was national Catholic chaplain of the Civil Air Patrol and a member of the Naval Aviation Cadet Selection Board from 1942 to 1945. He was also chaplain, with the rank of major, for the 8th Regiment of the New York National Guard from 1943 to 1948. With this experience, on December 3, 1955, Furlong was appointed Auxiliary Bishop to the US Military Vicariate, a responsibility at the time of the archbishop of New York. Cardinal Francis Spellman, Archbishop of New York, consecrated Furlong bishop on January 25, 1956. At the death of Cardinal Spellman on December 2, 1967, Furlong served as administrator of the military vicariate until the appointment of Archbishop (later Cardinal) Terence Cooke as new military vicar on April 4, 1968.

Furlong retired from the Vicariate in 1971 at 78 and died April 13, 1989, in the rectory of St. Thomas More as Auxiliary Bishop Emeritus, at 96, the oldest Roman Catholic bishop in the United States.

== See also ==
- Catholic Church hierarchy
- Catholic Church in the United States
- Historical list of the Catholic bishops of the United States
- Insignia of chaplain schools in the United States military
- List of Catholic bishops of the United States
- List of Catholic bishops of the United States: military service
- Lists of patriarchs, archbishops, and bishops
- Military chaplain
- Religious symbolism in the United States military
- United States military chaplains

Catholic Church titles
Preceded by –	Auxiliary Bishop for the Military Services, USA; 1956 – 1971	Succeeded by –
