= William Muhm =

American Roman Catholic priest and bishop

His Excellency, The Most Reverend William James Muhm
- Auxiliary Bishop for the Military Services, USA; Titular Bishop of Capsus
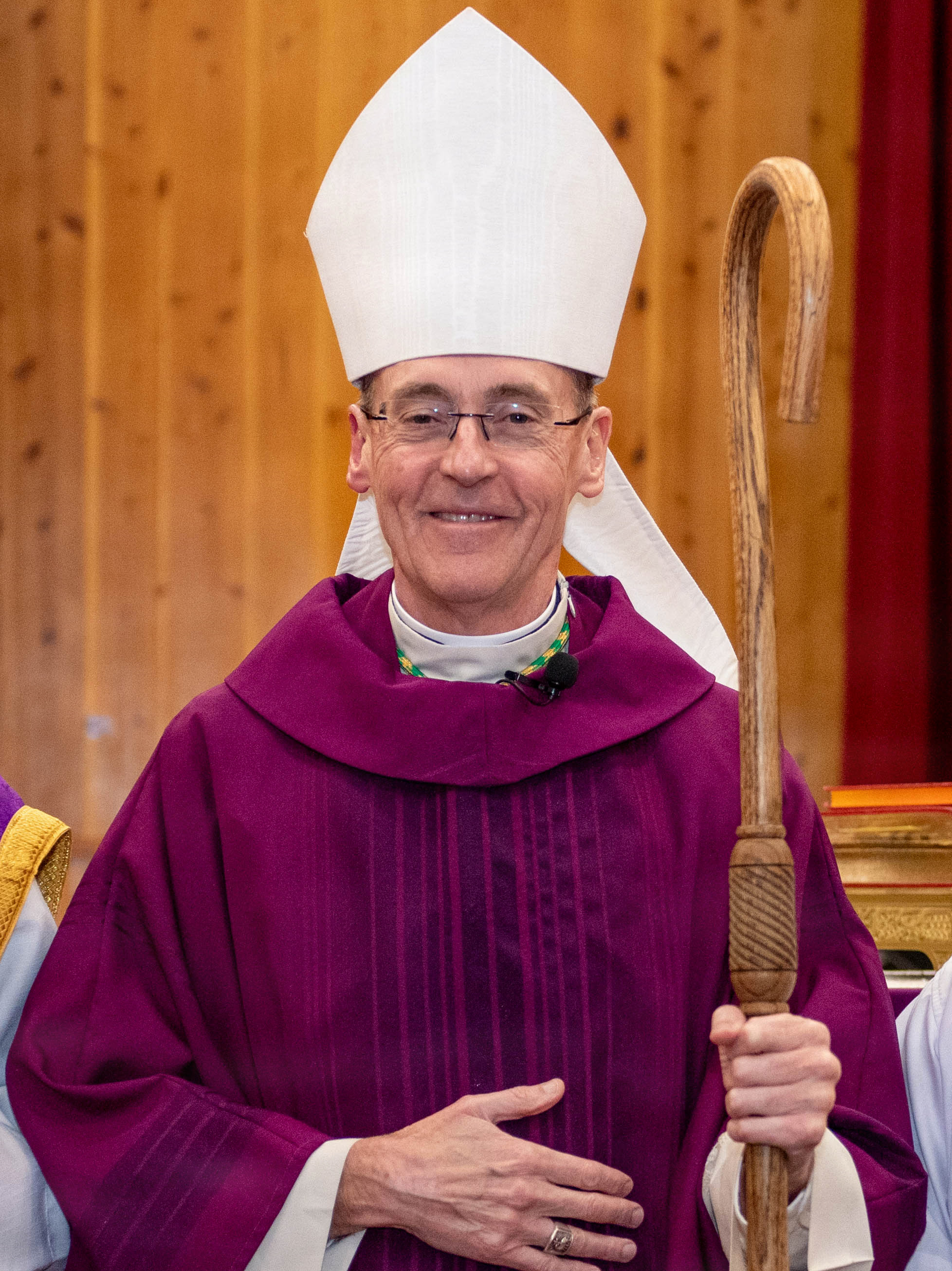
- Bishop Muhm after Mass in 2025
- Archdiocese: Military Services, USA
- Appointed: January 22, 2019
- Installed: March 25, 2019
- Other post: Titular Bishop of Capsus

Orders
- Ordination: May 13, 1995 by John O'Connor
- Consecration: March 25, 2019 by Timothy Broglio, Timothy M. Dolan, and Charles J. Chaput

Personal details
- Born: June 27, 1957 (age 69) Billings, Montana, US
- Education: Colorado State University; St. Joseph's Seminary and College
- Motto: He is risen

Styles of William James Muhm
- Reference style: His Excellency; The Most Reverend
- Spoken style: Your Excellency
- Religious style: Bishop

William James Muhm (born June 27, 1957) is an American prelate of the Roman Catholic Church. He has served as auxiliary bishop for the Archdiocese for the Military Services, USA since 2019.

== Biography ==
=== Early life ===
William (Bill) Muhm was born in Billings, Montana on June 27, 1957, the son of James and Anne Muhm. When he was a child, the family moved to Denver, Colorado. Muhm attended Colorado State University in Fort Collins, Colorado, where he received a BS degree in Business Administration in 1980.

=== Military service ===
After college graduation, he entered the US Navy Officer Training Command Newport in Newport, Rhode Island. In July 1981, Muhm was commissioned an ensign in the Navy Supply Corps.

Muhm's first posting in the Navy was two tours on the USS Belleau Wood (LHA-3), an amphibious assault ship, in the Western Pacific Ocean. His next assignment was at the Naval Air Engineering Station Lakehurst in Lakehurst, New Jersey.

=== Preparation for priesthood ===
In 1986, Muhm left the Navy to work as an accountant while remaining in the US Naval Reserve.

By 1989, Muhm had decided to enter the priesthood and went into the minor seminary for the Archdiocese of New York. He later graduated from St. Joseph's Seminary in Yonkers, New York, the major seminary for the archdiocese.

=== Priesthood ===
In May 1995, Muhm was ordained to the priesthood by Cardinal John O'Connor for the Archdiocese of New York at St. Patrick's Cathedral in New York City. After his 1995 ordination, the archdiocese assigned Muhm to the pastoral staff at St. Ann Parish in Ossining, New York. The next year, he was sent to Holy Family Parish in Staten Island, New York, for the next two years. In 1996, he was also assigned as chaplain to Fleet Hospital 22.

In 1998, the Navy recalled Muhm to active duty, this time as a member of the United States Navy Chaplain Corps. His assignments included an extended deployment on the USS WASP (LHD-1), an amphibious assault ship, in the Arabian Sea after the September 11th attacks. He also served with the 1st Marine Division in Anbar Province, Iraq during the Iraq Insurgency. Muhn also had assignments at the U.S. Naval Academy in Annapolis, Maryland, and at Camp Lejuene in Jacksonville, North Carolina. Muhm retired from the Navy on May 1, 2018, with the rank of Navy Captain.

=== Auxiliary Bishop of the Military Services USA ===
Pope Francis appointed Muhm as auxiliary bishop for the Archdiocese for the Military Services, USA and titular bishop of Capsus on January 22, 2019. On March 25, 2019, Muhm was installed and consecrated by Archbishop Timothy Broglio at the Basilica of the National Shrine of the Immaculate Conception in Washington, D.C., with Cardinal Timothy M. Dolan and Archbishop Charles J. Chaput acting as co-consecrators.

== See also ==
- Catholic Church hierarchy
- Catholic Church in the United States
- Historical list of the Catholic bishops of the United States
- List of Catholic bishops of the United States
- Lists of patriarchs, archbishops, and bishops

== Episcopal succession ==
Catholic Church titles
Preceded by -	Auxiliary Bishop for the Military Services, USA; 2019-Present	Succeeded by -
