= Joseph L. Coffey =

American Roman Catholic priest and bishop

His Excellency, The Most Reverend Joseph Lawrence Coffey
- Auxiliary Bishop for the Military Services, USA; Titular Bishop of Capsus
- Archdiocese: Military Services, USA
- Appointed: January 22, 2019
- Installed: March 25, 2019
- Other post: Titular Bishop of Capsus

Orders
- Ordination: May 18, 1996 by Anthony Joseph Bevilacqua
- Consecration: March 25, 2019 by Timothy Broglio, Timothy M. Dolan, and Charles J. Chaput

Personal details
- Born: May 31, 1960 (age 66) Rochester, Minnesota, US
- Education: La Salle University; Sorbonne University
- Motto: Christus vivificans (Christ is alive)

Styles of Joseph Lawrence Coffey
- Reference style: His Excellency; The Most Reverend
- Spoken style: Your Excellency
- Religious style: Bishop

Joseph Lawrence Coffey (born May 31, 1960) is an American prelate of the Roman Catholic church, serving as an auxiliary bishop for the Archdiocese for the Military Services, USA since 2019. He previously served as a chaplain in the US Navy Chaplain Corps in the United States, Japan and Afghanistan.

== Biography ==
=== Early life ===
Joseph Coffey was born in Rochester, Minnesota, on May 31, 1960, the son of Dr. William F. X Coffey and Roseanita Schubert Coffey. He is the fifth of nine children. Coffey attended Archbishop John Carroll High School in Radnor, Pennsylvania, graduating in 1978. Coffey then entered La Salle University in Philadelphia, Pennsylvania, spending one year studying at the Sorbonne University in Paris. He graduated in 1982 with bachelor's degrees in English and French.

After graduating from LaSalle, Coffey spent the next five years teaching grade school, acting as a ski instructor in Switzerland, and working in the automobile industry in Germany and Belgium.

Deciding to enter the priesthood, Coffey enrolled at the St. Charles Borromeo Seminary in Wynnewood, Pennsylvania, graduating with a Master of Divinity degree. During this period in seminary, Coffey was involved with Operation Rescue protests at women's health clinics around the United States. In a 2020 interview, Coffey said that he was arrested in a dozen cities during these protests.

In May 1992, Coffey entered the U.S. Navy Chaplain Candidate Program with the rank of ensign. Coffey served in the US Naval Reserve for the next nine years.

=== Priesthood ===
On May 18, 1996, Coffey was ordained to the priesthood by Cardinal Anthony Bevilacqua for the Archdiocese of Philadelphia at the Cathedral Basilica of Saints Peter and Paul in Philadelphia. The archdiocese assigned Coffey as an associate pastor at St. Katherine of Siena Parish in Philadelphia. After five years at St. Katherine, he became an active duty Navy chaplain in September 2001.

Coffey’s duty assignments have included attachment to a combat assault battalion in Okinawa and as command chaplain on the USS George Washington (CVN 73) on deployment to the Persian Gulf. He also served as command chaplain at the U.S. Coast Guard Training Center in Cape May, New Jersey. Coffey spend seven months deployed with a US Marines air unit to Camp Leatherneck in Afghanistan during the Afghan War.

After an assignment at U.S. Navy Recruiting Command in St. Louis, Missouri, Coffey was assigned as command chaplain on the USS Ronald Reagan (CVN 76) both in Yokosuka, Japan and at sea in the South Pacific Ocean. Coffey's final assignment as a naval chaplain was assistant chief of staff for religious ministry at Marine Corps Recruit Depot San Diego in California.

=== Auxiliary Bishop of the Military Services, USA ===
Pope Francis appointed Coffey as an auxiliary bishop for the Archdiocese of the Military Services, USA and titular bishop of Capsus on January 22, 2019. On March 25, 2019, Coffey was consecrated at the Basilica of the National Shrine of the Immaculate Conception in Washington, D.C., by Archbishop Timothy Broglio, with Cardinal Timothy M. Dolan, and Archbishop Charles J. Chaput acting as co-consecrators.

== See also ==
- Catholic Church hierarchy
- Catholic Church in the United States
- Historical list of the Catholic bishops of the United States
- List of Catholic bishops of the United States
- Lists of patriarchs, archbishops, and bishops

== Episcopal succession ==
Catholic Church titles
Preceded by -	Auxiliary Bishop for the Military Services, USA; 2019-Present	Succeeded by -
