= Barry Ryan (Catholic priest) =

American former Roman Catholic priest (born 1948)

- Born: January 23, 1948 (age 78); United States
- Occupation: Former Catholic priest
- Status: Free
- Conviction: Child sexual abuse
- Penalty: 2 years imprisonment 3 years on parole

Barry Edmund Ryan (born January 23, 1948) is an American former Roman Catholic priest who pleaded guilty to repeatedly molesting a six-year-old boy, for which he was sentenced to two years in prison.

== Biography ==
After his ordination in 1976, Ryan worked in parishes in Brooklyn, New York before commissioning as a chaplain in the U.S. Air Force in 1984. He was suspended from the priesthood in 1995 after allegations of improper sexual conduct while he had been stationed at Mobile, Alabama. Ryan was suspended from his priestly duties.

Until the spring of 2003, he was a library media specialist at Martin County High School in Stuart, Florida, where he was named Teacher of the Year in 2001. He took a medical leave of absence in the wake of news reports that he might have been involved in improper sexual activity during his time as an Air Force chaplain. He was diagnosed around this time with reportedly terminal liver cancer. Shortly afterwards, between May and October 2003, he forced a six-year-old boy to perform oral sex upon him at the boy's family home in Long Island.

In his written confession, Ryan said he received inpatient treatment for pedophilia, depression and alcoholism at Saint Luke Institute, a psychiatric hospital in Silver Spring, Maryland in 2004. Ryan attempted to commit suicide in 2007 by slitting his own throat. Shortly thereafter, he was ordered from the Missouri hospice in which he was residing to begin serving his two-year sentence in New York. Ryan currently resides in Dittmer, Missouri, at the Vianney Renewal Center.

== See also ==
- Roman Catholic Church sex abuse scandal
- Roman Catholic priests accused of sex offenses
- Crimen sollicitationis
