= Insignia of chaplain schools in the United States military =

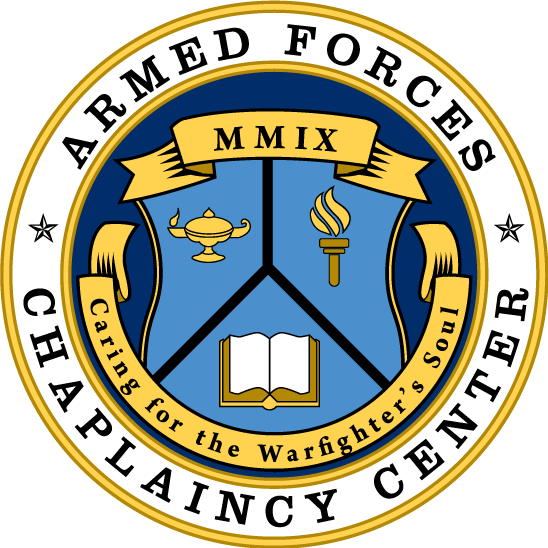
Armed Forces Chaplaincy Center emblem, side one (obverse) of AFCC coin

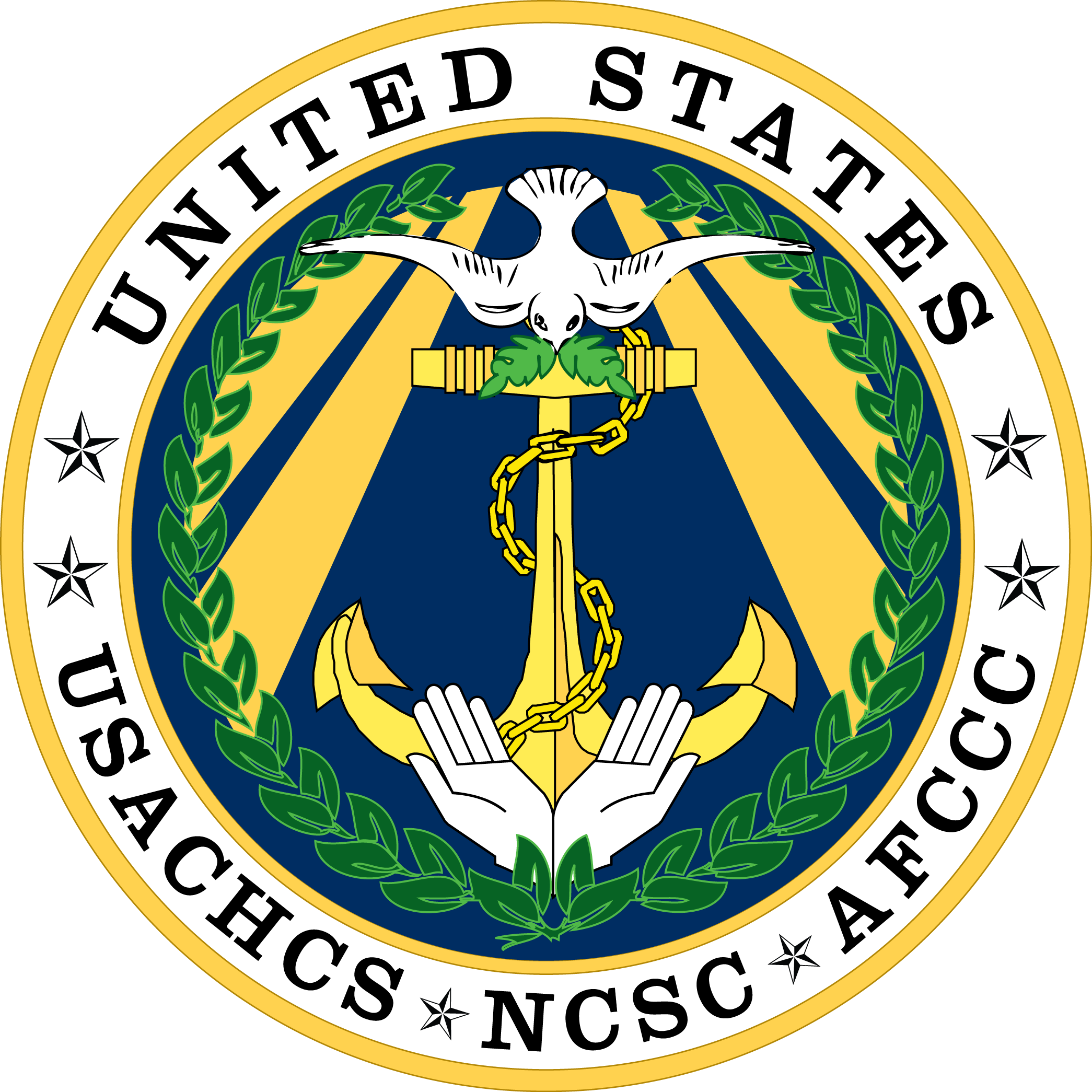
Armed Forces Chaplaincy Center emblem, side two (reverse) of AFCC coin

In addition to the three official Chaplain Corps seals for the army, navy, and air force, chaplaincies also have special seals and emblems for special schools and organizations for their chaplains, as well as a shared emblem for the "Armed Forces Chaplaincy Center" (AFCC), Fort Jackson, Columbia, South Carolina, where chaplains from all branches of the military receive their training. The original AFCC emblem had three symbols traditionally associated with learning and wisdom—a lamp, a torch and a book. A second emblem was developed by the Commandants and Commanding Officer of the three schools, in part so that it could be used on the reverse side of a two-sided AFCC challenge coin, with one symbol drawn from each of the army, navy, and Chaplain Corps emblems: a dove from the army emblem, cupped hands from the air force emblem, and an anchor from the navy emblem. In addition to using both emblems on the two sides of the AFCC coin, both designs were displayed in the AFCC lobby.

Also included on the front side of the emblem were the words "Caring for the warfighter's soul," a phrase which has been called "both the motto and the vision of the Armed Forces Chaplaincy Center." Training at the AFCC was provided by three service schools co-located on its campus: the US Army Chaplain Center and School (USACHCS), the US Naval Chaplaincy School and Center (NCSC), and the US Air Force Chaplain Corps College (AFCCC). According to USAF Chaplain Steven Keith, the first Director of the AFCC, "Caring for the warfighter's soul" was the "vision" that "binds the Air Force Chaplain Corps College, the Army Chaplain Center and School, and the Naval Chaplaincy School and Center together." The new facilities were dedicated May 6, 2010, under a plan that rotated the Director of the AFCC among the three military services, each serving in that position for one year at a time.

Religious symbols were included in designs for older Chaplain School seals, such as the U.S. Army Chaplain School insignia, approved December 26, 1961, that included the symbols for Christian and Jewish chaplains. Current designs all include symbols for shared concepts such as wisdom, learning, faith and peace, instead. Only the Army Chaplain Center and School unit insignia and device incorporates images taken directly from its Chaplain Corps Seal/branch plaque, and they are the only ones to include a biblical verse from the Hebrew scriptures, "The fear of the Lord is the beginning of wisdom."

The new school seals also reflected name changes resulting from the move to the AFCC, when the schools that formerly only trained chaplains now train chaplain assistants and religious program specialists, as well. So, for example, the Naval Chaplains School's name was changed on October 1, 2009 to the Naval Chaplaincy School and Center (NCSC). The Air Force school changed its name from the USAF Chaplain Service Institute to the USAF Chaplain Corps College.

== Army ==
The U.S. Army Chaplain School, the oldest U.S. School for military training, was proposed in 1917, and approved February 9, 1918, to support the increasingly large military required for World War I. The first class began on March 3, 1918, at Fort Monroe, in Virginia.

=== Device (coat of arms) ===
The first device (coat of arms) for the school (then "The Chaplains' School of the United States Army") was approved May 18, 1925 when the school was at Fort Leavenworth (Kansas), showing a cross against the backdrop of a Torah scroll. This design was slightly altered on March 2, 1927. The design was redesignated for the Chaplain School at Fort Slocum (New York) on April 17, 1952, and the same design (cross against backdrop of scroll) was approved for the "distinctive insignia" of the school. On December 6, 1961, the design was changed to show the two separate chaplain insignias for Christian chaplains (cross) and Jewish chaplains (two tablets of the ten commandments, topped by the six-pointed Star of David), with the commandments on the tablets represented by the first ten Roman numerals. On December 23, 1983, the design was changed to replace the Roman numerals with the first ten letters of the Hebrew alphabet, to reflect the change in Chaplain insignia worn with uniforms, and this new device was the first to use the title "The Chaplain School of the United States Army," rather than "The Chaplains' School of the United States Army." On February 11, 1993, the design of the device was changed to use symbols of faith and wisdom from the Chaplain Corps emblem, rather than specific religious symbols. This device is now used for the Army Chaplain Center and School, although the words in the device reflect the school's historic title, "The Chaplain School of the United States Army."

Army Chaplain School emblems

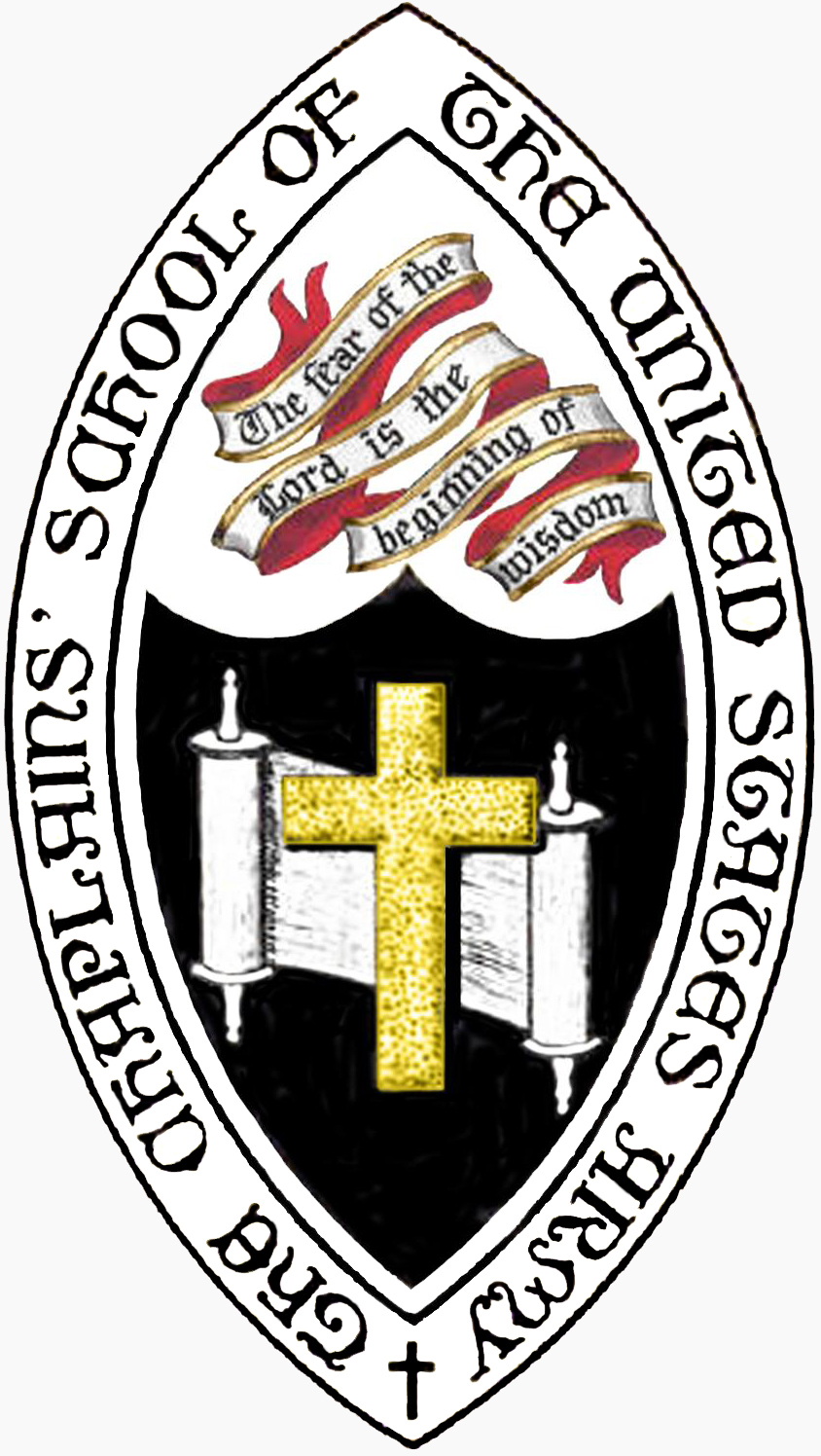
Old Army Chaplains' School device, with symbol of Torah scroll and cross, May 18, 1925

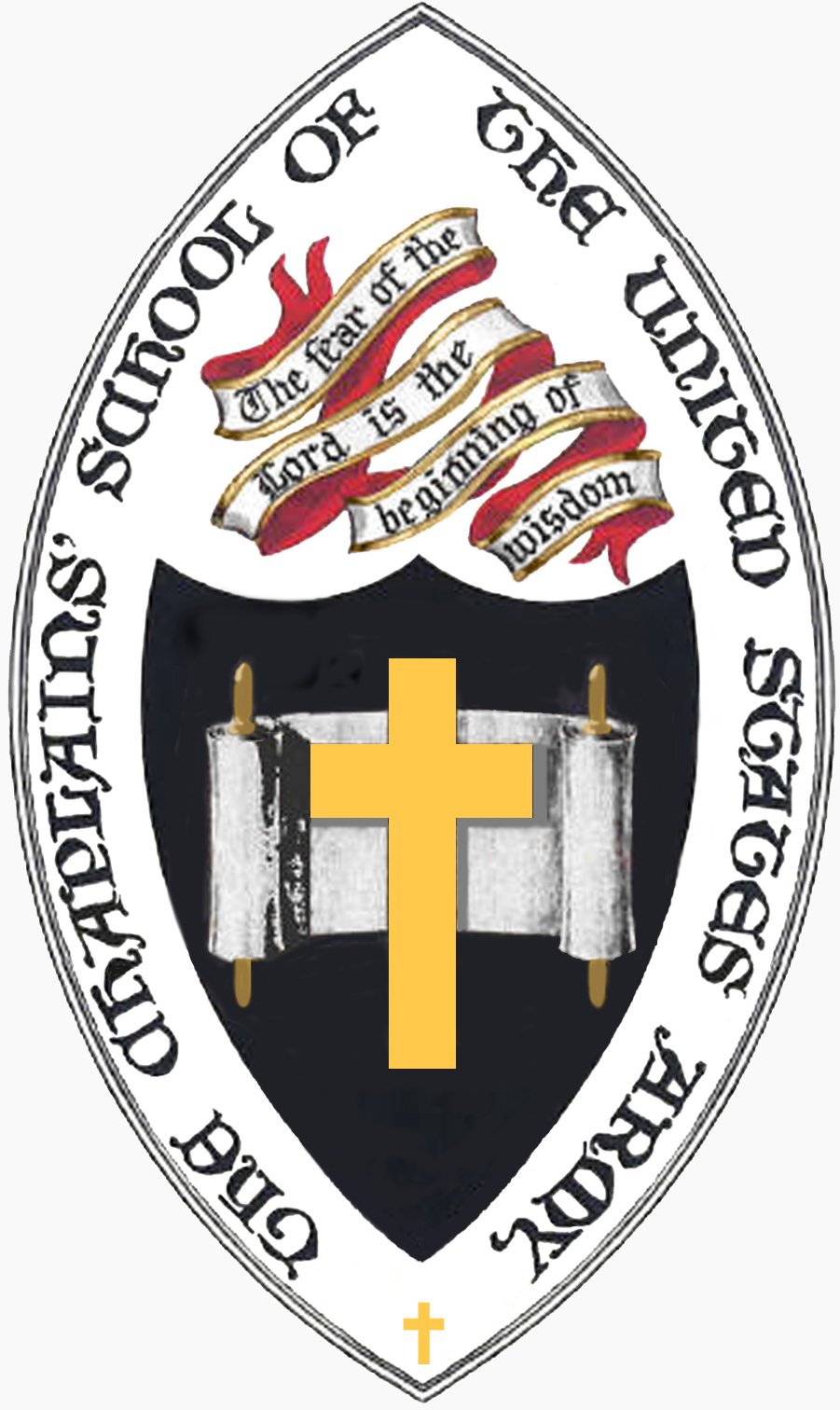
Old Army Chaplains' School device (coat of arms), with symbol of Torah scroll and cross, March 2, 1927, and redesignated April 17, 1952

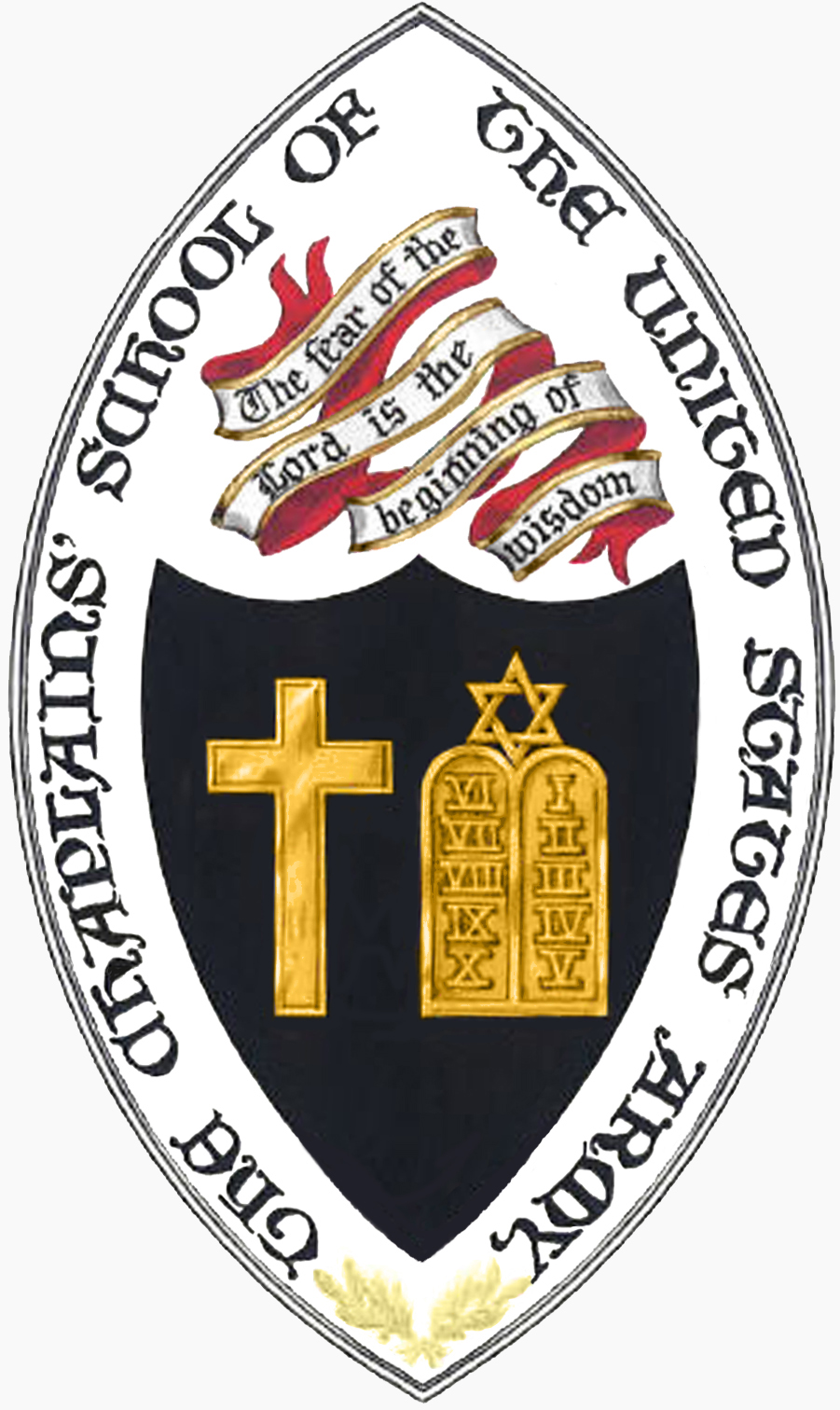
Old Army Chaplains' School device (coat of arms), with Christian and Jewish symbols (Roman numerals), December 6, 1961

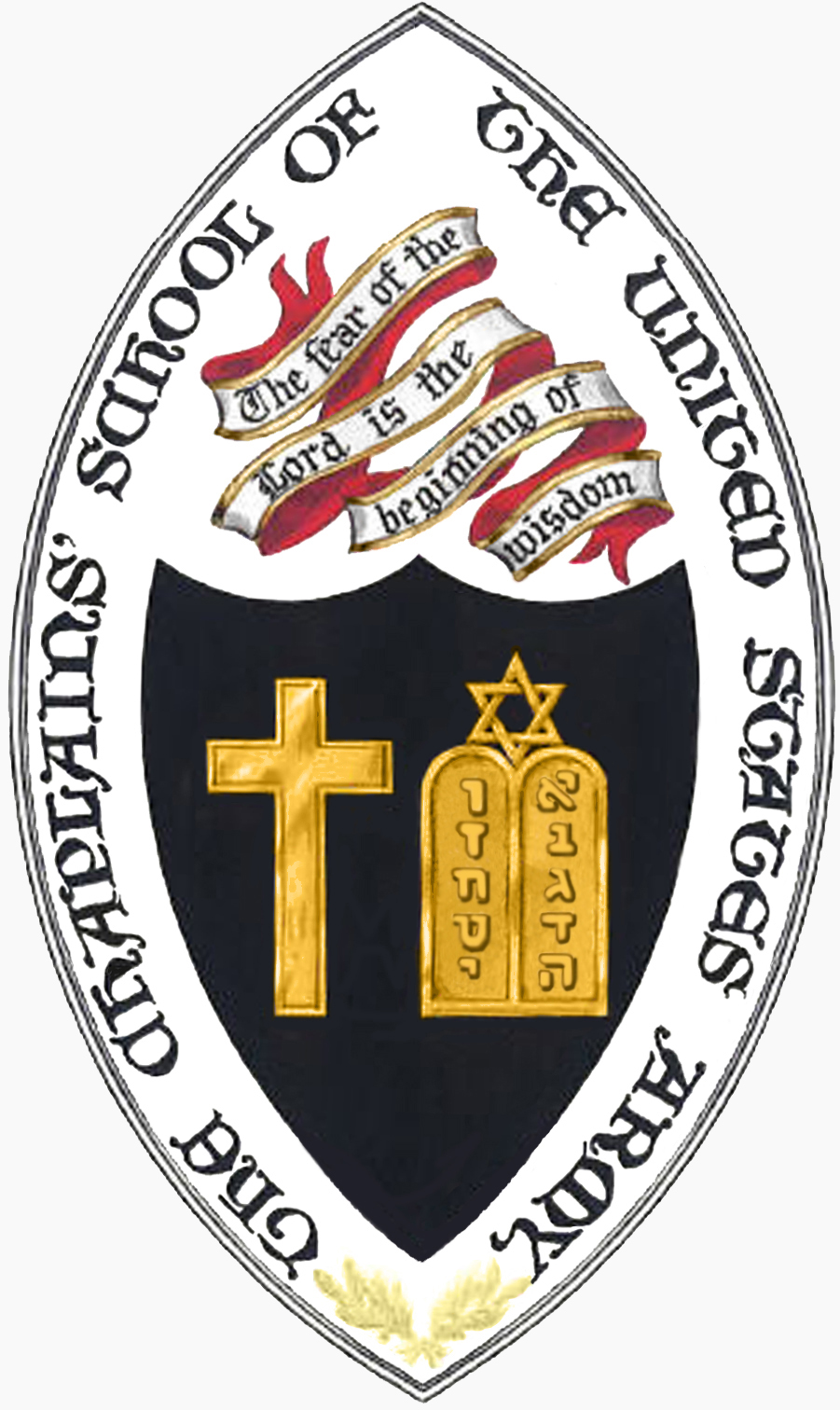
Old Army Chaplain School device (coat of arms), with Christian and Jewish symbols (Hebrew letters), and the change from "Chaplains' School" to "Chaplain School," December 23, 1983

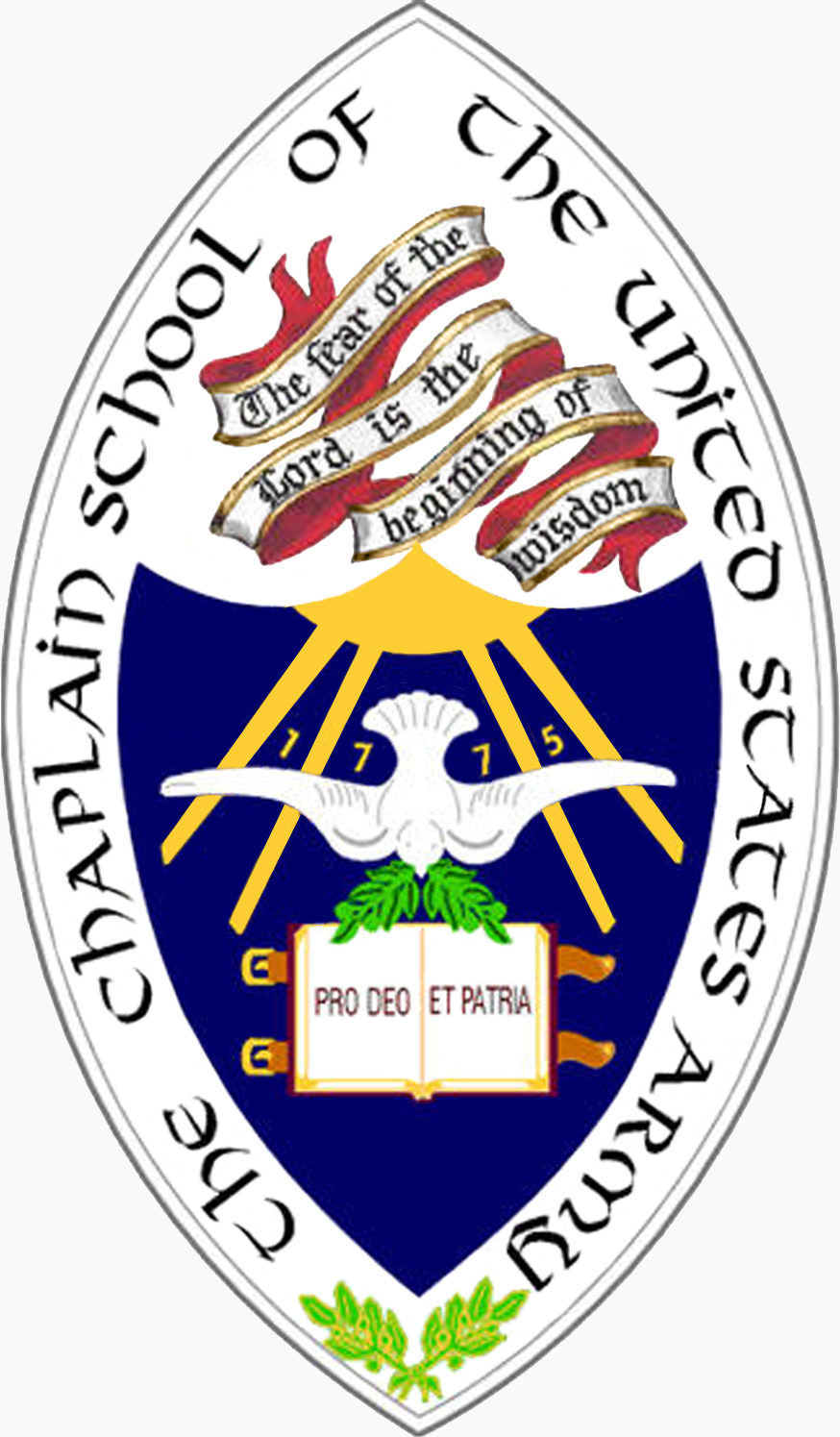
Current US Army Chaplain Center and School device (although device still reads "The Chaplain School of the United States Army"), with no specific religious symbols, February 11, 1993

=== Distinctive unit insignia ===
The first distinctive unit insignia for the school was approved April 17, 1952, when the March 2, 1927 coat of arms design was redesignated for the school at Fort Slocum. This design showed the cross superimposed over an open Torah scroll. Succeeding changes in design were made on the same dates for both the device (coat of arms) and distinctive unit insignia: December 6, 1961, to show the cross and tablets, with Roman numerals in the tablets; December 23, 1983, to replace the Roman numerals with Hebrew letters, and February 11, 1993, to change to the current insignia for the United States Chaplain Center and School, showing no specific religious symbols.

Army Chaplain School distinctive unit insignia

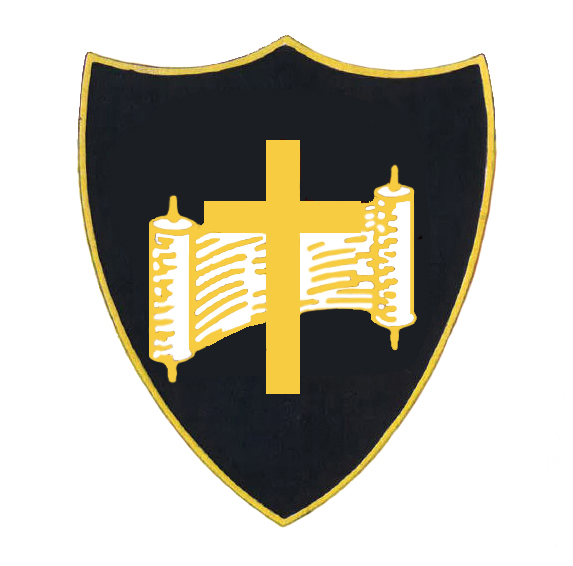
Original US Army Chaplain School seal, with cross and open Torah scroll, 1952

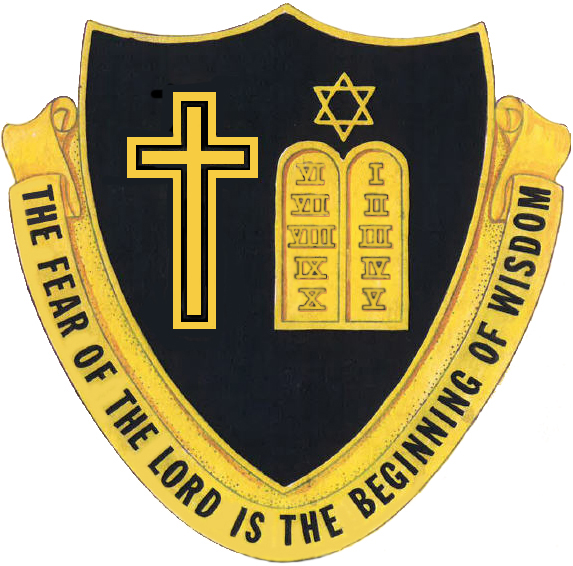
Old US Army Chaplain School seal, with Christian and Jewish religious symbols—with Roman numerals in the Jewish symbol, 1961

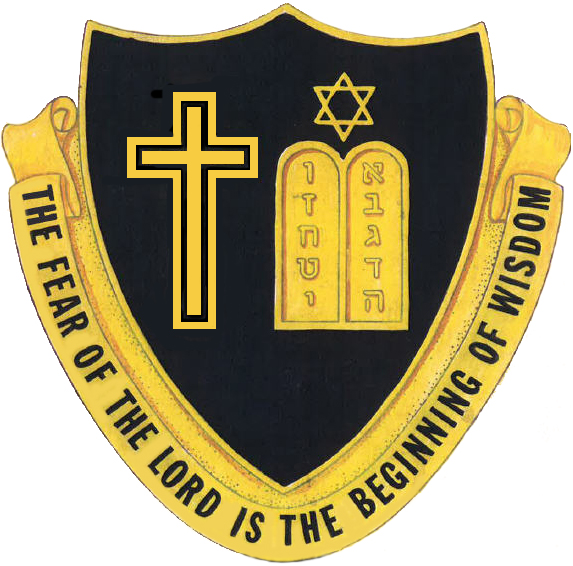
Old US Army Chaplain School seal, with Christian and Jewish religious symbols—with Hebrew letters in the Jewish symbol, 1983

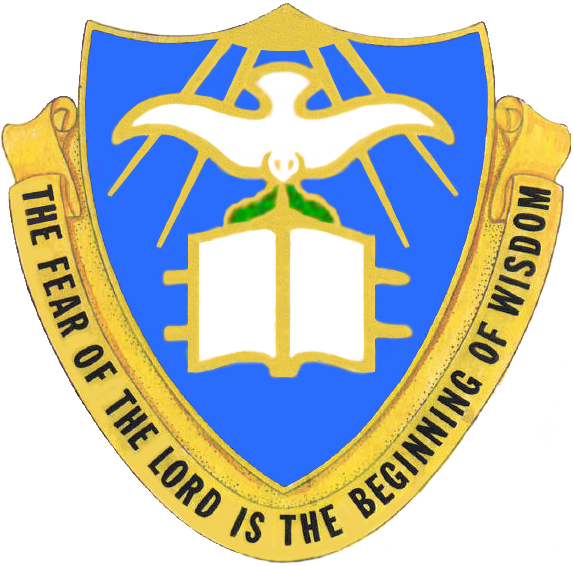
Current US Army Chaplain Center and School unit insignia, with no specific religious symbols, 1993

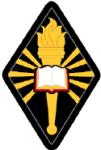
Shoulder sleeve insignia

=== Shoulder sleeve insignia ===
The Shoulder Sleeve Insignia was approved on September 13, 1991. The Institute of Heraldry describes the symbolism in the design as follows: "Black is the branch color of the Chaplain Corps. Gold is emblematic of excellence and white denotes purity. The torch signifies knowledge and leadership. The open book symbolizes the sacred "word" and the divine knowledge and wisdom of religion. The open book is radiating ten rays suggesting spiritual enlightenment."

=== Navy ===
The first Naval Chaplain School was created in February 1942 when civilian clergy, the majority of whom had no prior military experience, entered the Navy to serve during World War II. The school began at Naval Station Norfolk, Norfolk, Virginia, later moving to the campus of the College of William and Mary, in Williamsburg, Virginia, until its decommissioning November 15, 1945. With the beginning of the Korean War in 1951, the school was reestablished, located in Newport, Rhode Island until its move in 2009 to Fort Jackson, to the campus of the Armed Forces Chaplaincy Center, at Fort Jackson, South Carolina.

The school's first seal—then referred to as a "Coat of Arms"—was created in 1955, and included the motto "Cooperation without compromise" along with images of a hand or hands symbolizing rituals associated with faith group traditions linked to Protestant, Catholic, and Jewish faith group traditions. The raised hand is normally associated with Christian blessings, the hand with the spread fingers is associated with the Jewish Priestly blessing, and the hands holding a host are associated with the Christian sacrament or ritual of the Eucharist. In the outer ring of the seal, small versions of the Christian and Jewish chaplain insignia—the cross and the tablets of the Ten Commandments—are also included. The second version replaced the hand symbols with two more universal symbols of wisdom and learning, and a third image representing interracial/intercultural cooperation: clasped hands, one light and one dark.

The third version (1999) replaced the motto with the three values of spirituality, leadership, and humanity, and also added the initials of the four military communities served by USN chaplains: the Navy, Marine Corps, Coast Guard, and Merchant Marines. It also used only one shared symbol—the lamp—considered a universal symbol of wisdom and learning.

The name of the school was changed from the U.S. Naval Chaplains School when the school was moved to the Armed Forces Chaplain Center (AFCC) in 2009. At that time, training for Religious Program Specialists (RPs) was combined with chaplain training, and the name of the school was changed to the U.S. Naval Chaplaincy School and Center. The only change to the seal (other than the change of name) was the substitution of the word "flexibility" for the word on the 1999 seal, "humanity."

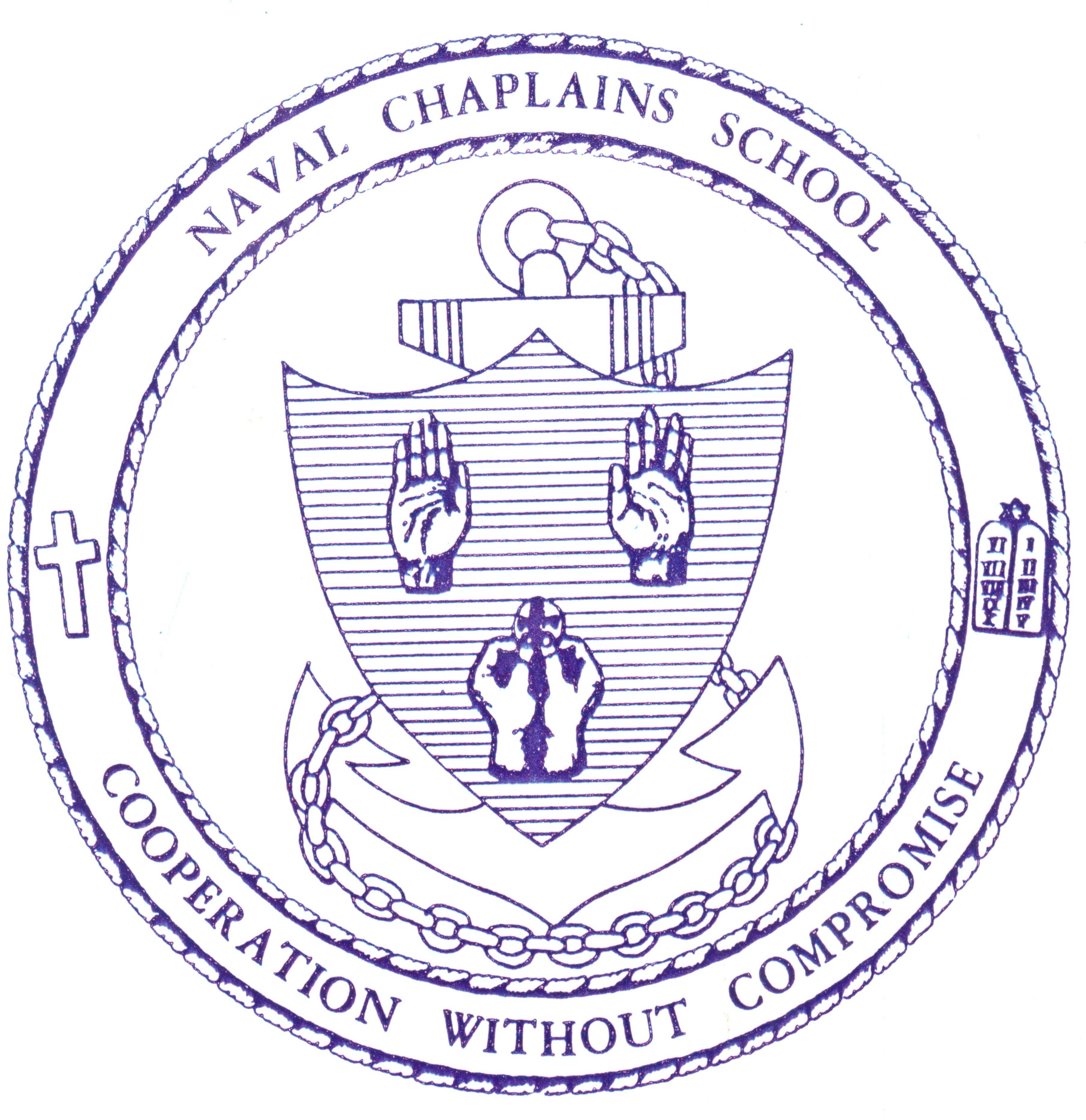
Non-color rendering, US Naval Chaplains School Seal (Coat of Arms), 1955, with hand symbols representing religious rituals

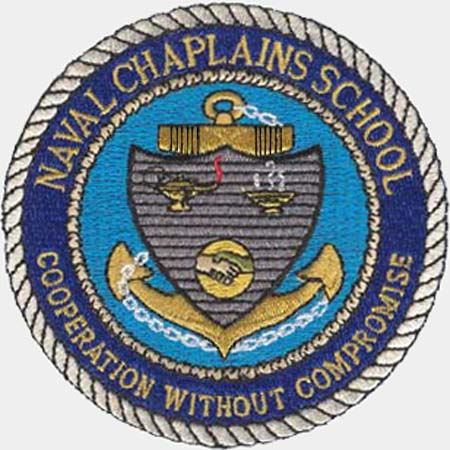
Patch showing US Naval Chaplains School Seal, with "universal" symbols of wisdom and cooperation

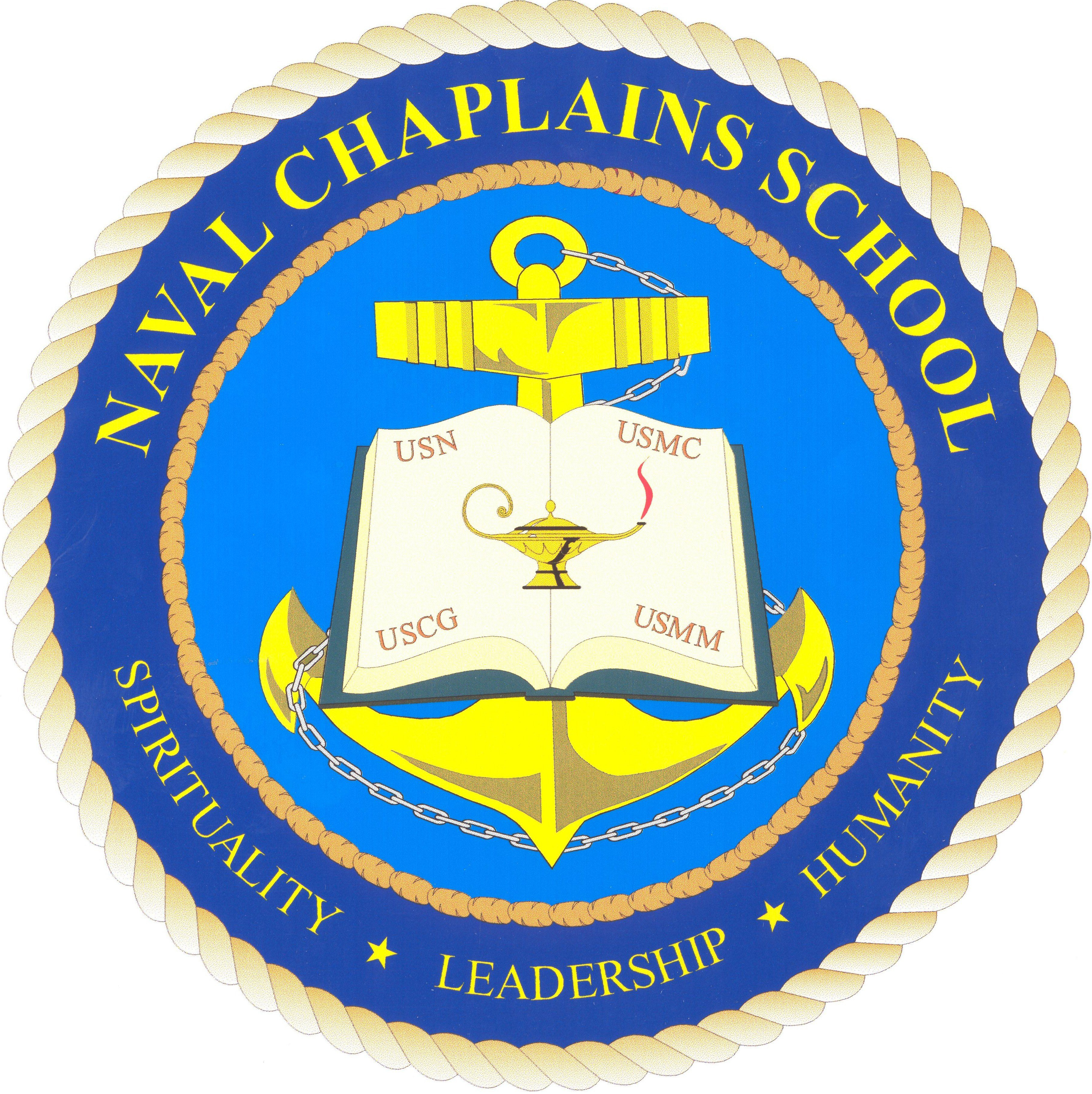
US Naval Chaplains School Seal, 1999

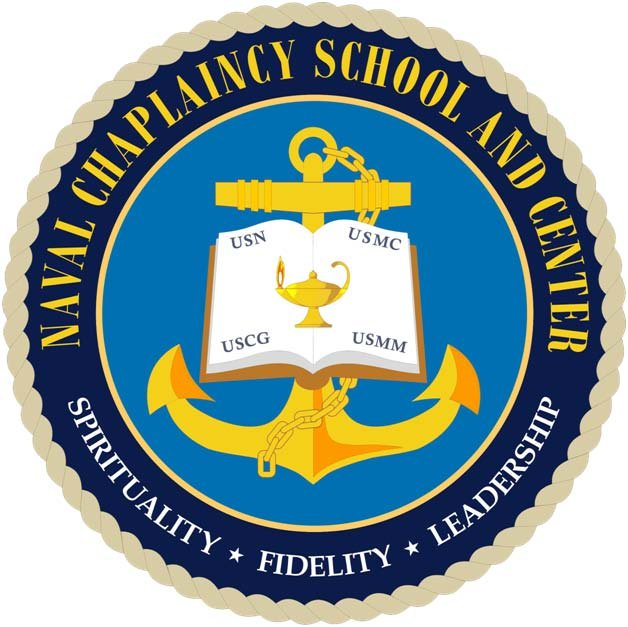
USN Chaplaincy School and Center emblem, showing new name, 2009

=== Air Force ===
Air Force chaplain training began July 1, 1953 (when the Air Force was given responsibility to train its own chaplains) when the Air Force Chaplains Course was created under the Officer Basic Military Course at Lackland Air Force Base. The USAF Chaplain School was established in June 1960, and its emblem was approved Oct 30, 1961, incorporating Christian and Jewish chaplain insignia, along with a motto that reads "Ut Omnes Unum Sint"—"That all may be one". The emblem was revised in 1966, still including the symbols for Christian and Jewish Chaplains, keeping the motto. However, when it was revised again in 1984, when the Roman numerals in the Jewish insignia changed to Hebrew letters, the motto was replaced with the school's title, "Air Force Chaplain School". On Oct 31, 1992, chaplain training was integrated into the Ira C. Eaker Center for Professional Development, and the school was redesignated as the U.S. Air Force Chaplain Service Institute (CSI, which also incorporated the Chaplain Service Resource Board, so that training and resourcing could be consolidated), located at Maxwell Air Force Base, Alabama. Chaplain Assistants, along with active duty, reserve, and Air National Guard chaplains were all included in CSI training. The motto as well as the specific religious symbols were all removed for the new CSI emblem. When the school moved to the campus of the Armed Forces Chaplaincy Center, Fort Jackson, (Columbia, South Carolina) in 2010, its name was changed to the USAF Chaplain Corps College and the current emblem was approved.

Air Force Chaplain School symbols

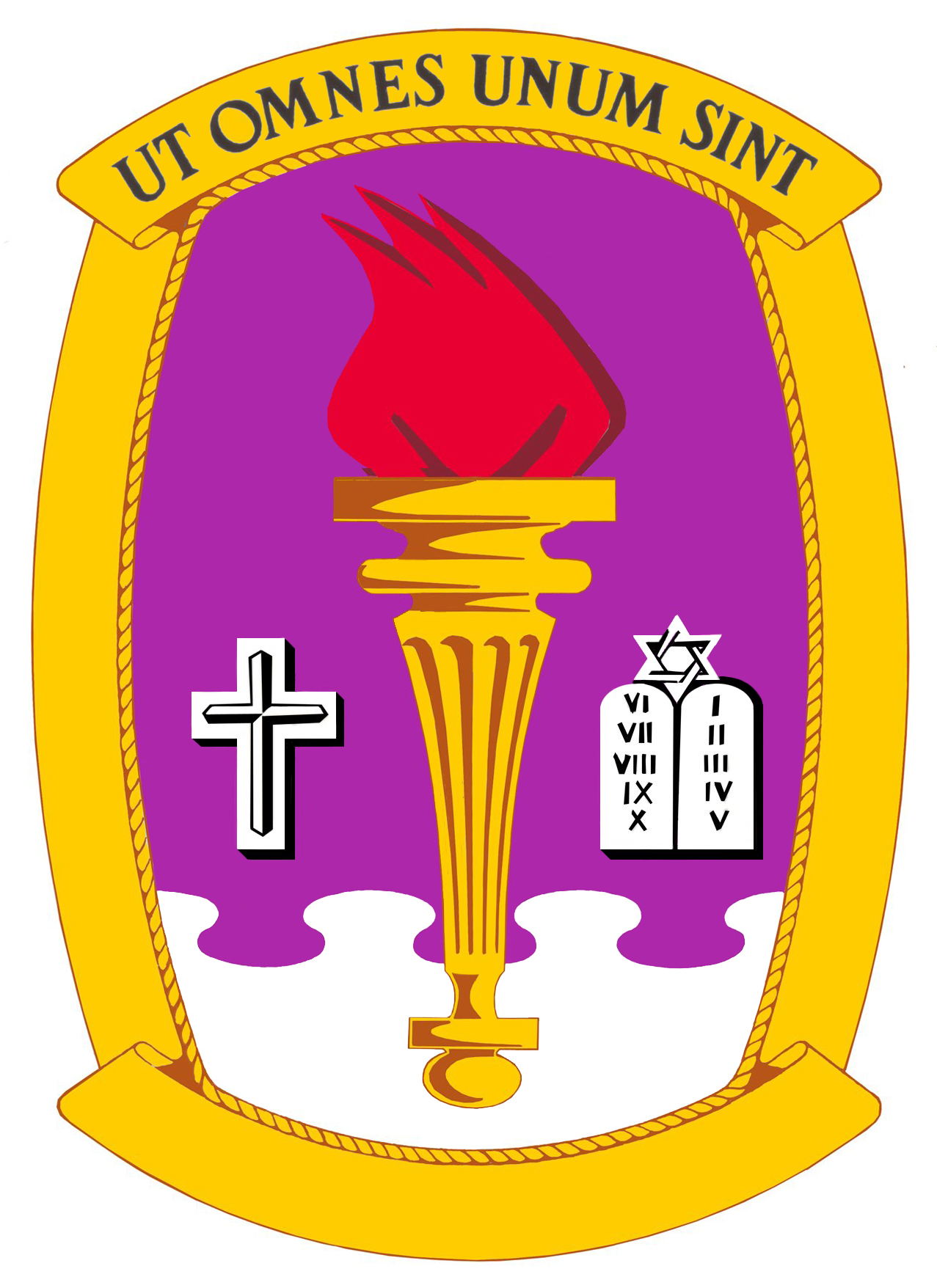
Old emblem, USAF Chaplain School, Christian and Jewish symbols, Roman numerals, with motto "That all may be one," 1961.

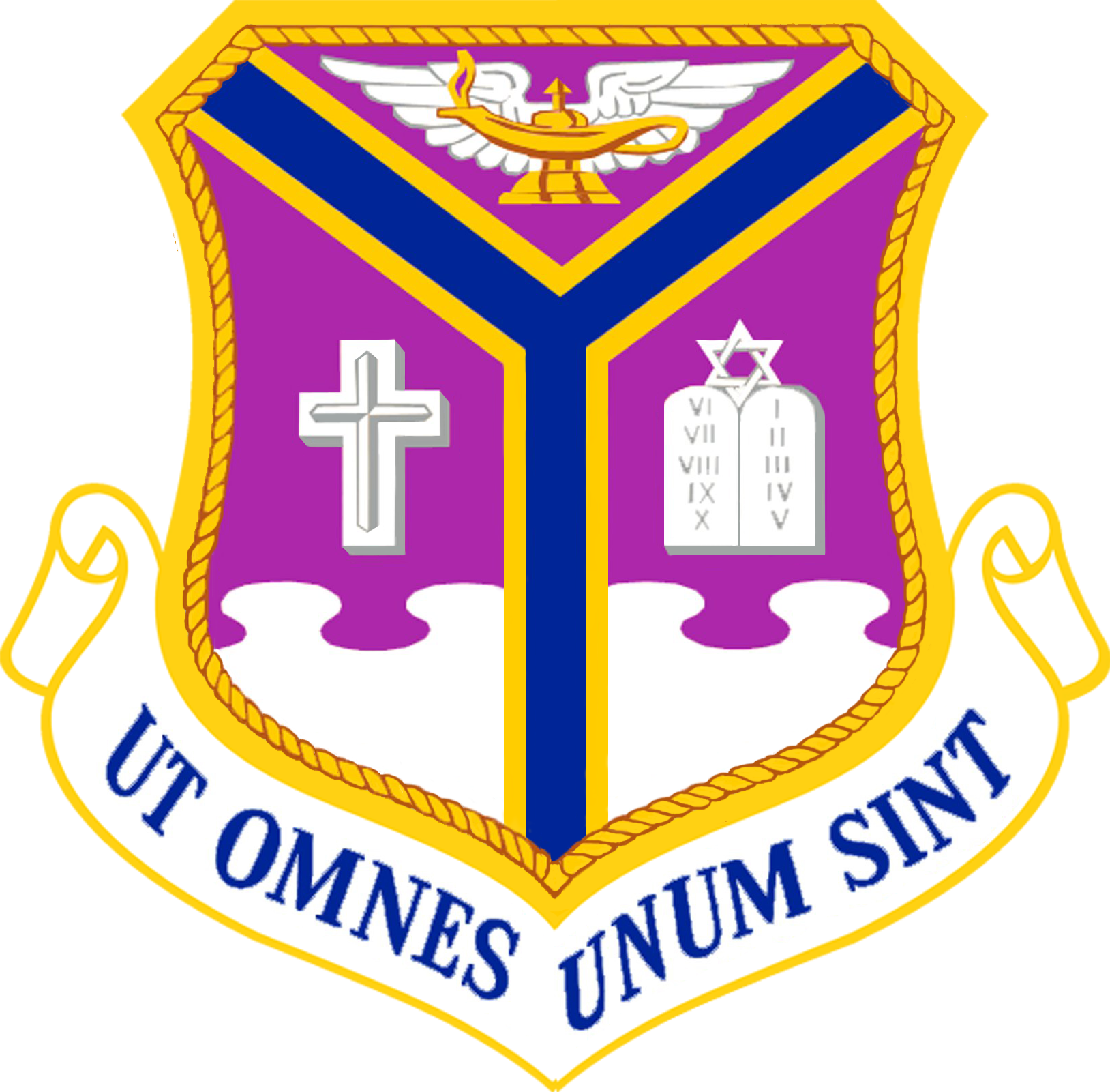
Old emblem, USAF Chaplain School, Christian and Jewish symbols, Roman numerals, same Latin motto, 1966

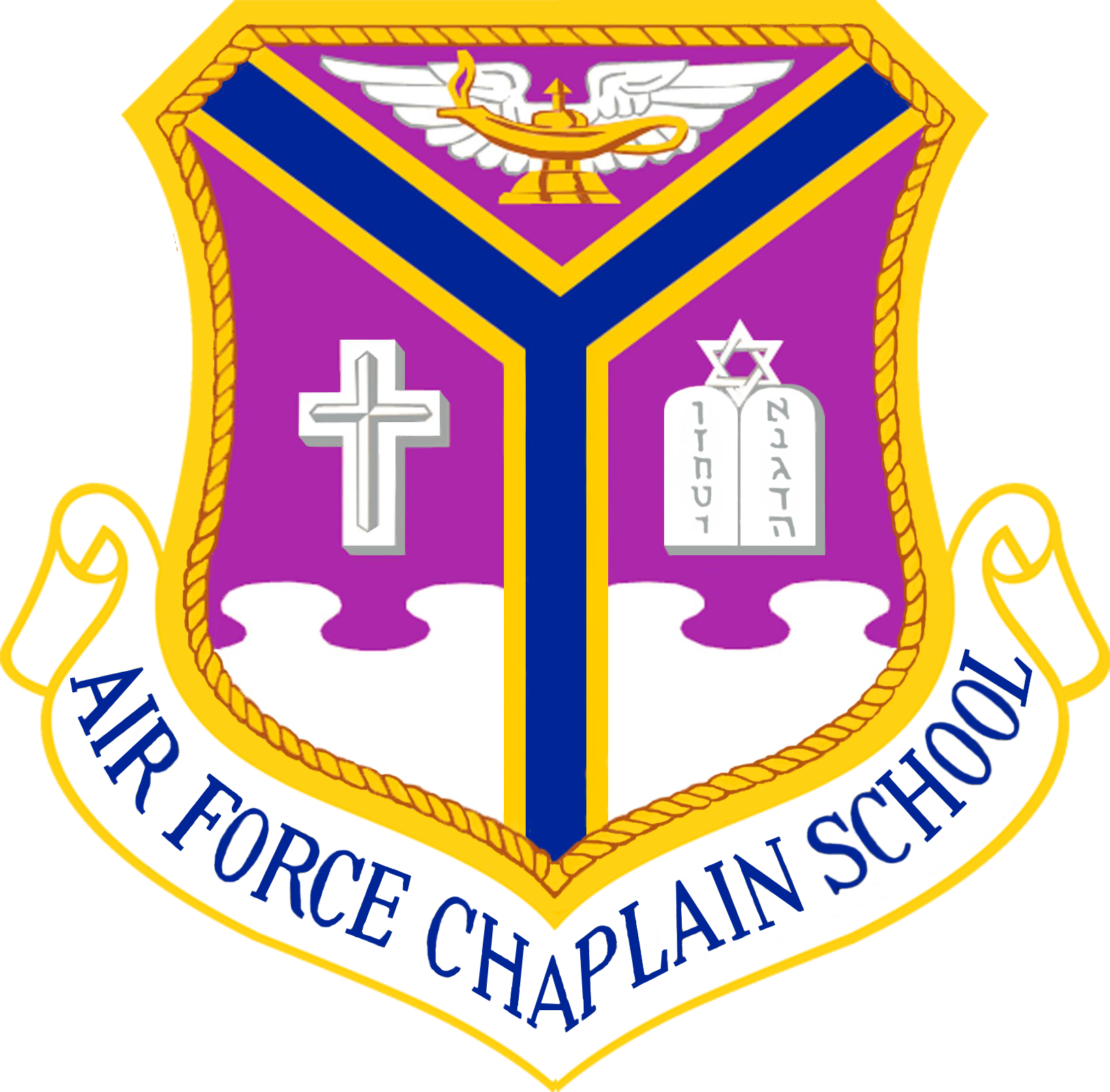
Old emblem, USAF Chaplain School, Christian and Jewish symbols, Hebrew letters, motto replaced with school title, 1984

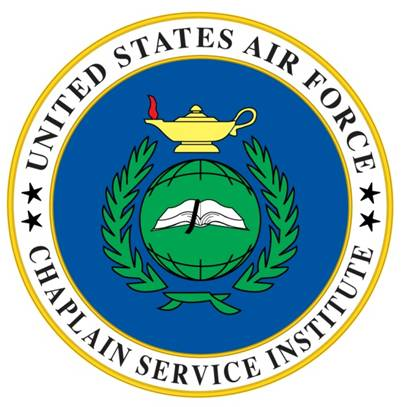
Emblem accompanying school name change, USAF Chaplain Service Institute, no specific religious symbols, 1992

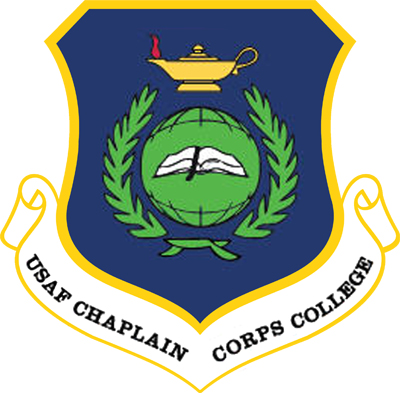
Shield for USAF Chaplain Corps College, no specific religious symbols, 2010

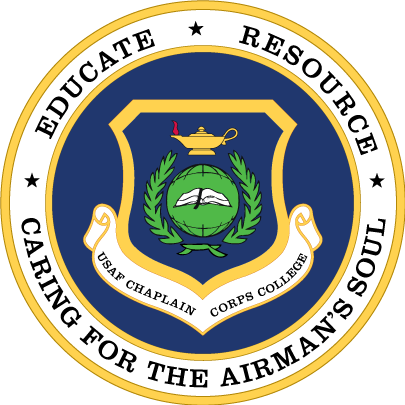
Emblem for USAF Chaplain Corps College, incorporating shield, no religious symbols, 2010
