= Robert Cox =

Robert Cox may refer to:

== Politicians ==
- Robert O. Cox (1917–2013), American politician, mayor of Fort Lauderdale, Florida, 1988–1991
- Robert Cox (Canadian politician) (1850–1934), former merchant and politician in Prince Edward Island, Canada
- Robert Cox (Florida politician) (1828–?), member of the Florida House of Representatives
- Robert Cox (Scottish politician) (1845–1899), Scottish politician, member of parliament for Edinburgh South, 1895–1899
- Robert Cox (Michigan politician) (1813–1890), member of the Michigan House of Representatives
- Bob Cox (politician), Canadian politician, 1977 Ontario general election
- Bobby Cox (politician) (born 1980), American politician, member of the South Carolina House of Representatives

== Sports ==
- Bobby Cox (1941–2026), American baseball manager and player
- Bobby Cox (footballer) (1934–2010), Scottish footballer
- Robert Cox (American football) or Robert Jenkins (born 1963), American football player

== Others ==
- Robert E. Cox (1917–1989), American optician and telescope maker
- Robert Edward Cox (1876–1937), American Medal of Honor recipient
- Robert M. Cox (1845–1932), American Medal of Honor recipient
- Robert W. Cox (1926–2018), Canadian international relations scholar
- Robert Cox (actor) (died 1655), English actor
- Robert Cox (Scottish lawyer) (1810–1872), Scottish lawyer, known as a writer on the Christian Sabbath, and phrenologist
- Robert Cox (journalist) (born 1933), British journalist, editor of the Buenos Aires Herald
- Robert H. Cox, American physiologist
- Doc Cox (Robert Cox, born 1946), British musician and former television journalist
- Robert Cox (civil servant) (1922–1981), British civil servant

== See also ==
- Robert Cox Cup, trophy awarded annually by the United States Golf Association for the United States Women's Amateur Golf Championship
- Robert Cox Clifton (1810–1861), English churchman, Canon of Manchester
- Robert Cocks & Co., a London-based music publisher
