= Morford =

Morford is a surname. Notable people with the surname include:

- Craig S. Morford (born 1959), American jurist
- Jerome Morford (1841–1910), American Civil War veteran
- Jill Morford, American linguist
- Mark Morford, American columnist

== See also ==
- Horford
