= List of Chaplain Corps Medal of Honor recipients =

American servicemen in the Chaplain Corps awarded the Medal of Honor

Military chaplaincy in the United States traces its origins back to the American Revolutionary War, being formally established on July 29, 1775, two weeks after the founding of the Continental Army. Created during the American Civil War (1861–1865), the Medal of Honor is the United States Armed Forces' highest military decoration and is awarded to service members who have distinguished themselves in combat situations by acts of valor. As of February 2026, it has been awarded to 3,529 people; among the recipients are nine Army and Navy chaplains, as well as one chaplain assistant. Francis B. Hall of the 16th New York Volunteer Infantry Regiment was the first chaplain to receive the Medal of Honor, for actions at the Battle of Salem Church in 1863.

Four of the chaplains who received the award served in the Union army during the American Civil War, one in the Navy during World War II, one in the Army in the Korean War, and the remaining three in the Vietnam War: two in the Army, and one in the Navy. All five chaplains awarded the honor since the Civil War have been Catholic priests, two of whom, Emil Kapaun and Vincent Capodanno, are in the process of canonization as saints.

One chaplain, Charles Liteky, returned the award, leaving it at the Vietnam Veterans Memorial in an envelope addressed to Ronald Reagan. Liteky is believed to be the only recipient of the award to renounce it for political reasons.

The Four Chaplains' Medal, sometimes called the "Chaplain's Medal of Honor", was created in 1960 for George L. Fox, Alexander D. Goode, John P. Washington, and Clark V. Poling, who were nominated for the Medal of Honor but were ineligible as they had not made contact with the enemy.

== Recipients ==
† indicates the Medal of Honor was awarded posthumously

=== Chaplains ===
Chaplains
Image	Name	Service	Unit	Religion	Place of action	Date of action	Notes/References
Portrait of Francis B. Hall, a male with dark hair, moustache, and beard.	Francis B. Hall	Union army	16th New York Infantry Regiment	Presbyterian	Battle of Salem Church	May 3, 1863	Hall carried wounded men to the rear under heavy fire during the Battle of Salem Church. He refused pay during his time of service.
Portrait of Milton L. Haney, an elderly man with a long white beard.	Milton L. Haney	Union army	55th Illinois Infantry Regiment	Methodist	Battle of Atlanta	July 22, 1864	Haney carried a musket during the Battle of Atlanta (Note: American chaplains were not formally forbidden from carrying weapons until 1989, though the practice was highly discouraged and practically forbidden.) and helped retake and hold a key position.
Portrait of James Hill, a man with dark hair and a beard.	James Hill	Union army	21st Iowa Infantry Regiment	Baptist	Battle of Champion Hill	May 16, 1863	Hill served as a first lieutenant in his unit. He captured three enemy pickets during the Battle of Champion Hill. He only became the regimental chaplain after receiving his medal.
Portrait of john Whitehead, a male with dark hear and closely-trimmed moustache and beard	John M. Whitehead	Union army	15th Indiana Infantry Regiment	Baptist	Battle of Stones River	December 31, 1862	Whitehead carried soldiers from the front lines to safety in the rear several times during the Battle of Stones River.
Portrait of Joseph O'Callahan, a clean-shaven man with spectacles	Joseph T. O'Callahan	United States Navy	USS Franklin (CV-13)	Catholic	Near Kobe, Japan	March 19, 1945	O'Callahan served aboard the USS Franklin (CV-13) when it was attacked by Japanese aircraft, and ministered to the wounded and dying amid smoke and explosions. He led damage control efforts, including jettisoning ammunition and flooding the magazine.
Portrait of Emil Kapaun, in military uniform, looking upwards.	Emil Kapaun †	United States Army	8th Cavalry Regiment	Catholic	Battle of Unsan	November 1–2, 1950	Kapaun cared for the wounded during the Battle of Unsan, walking under enemy fire to minister to wounded men. He was captured and placed in a POW camp, where he died of pneumonia in May 1951. He was awarded the Medal of Honor by Barack Obama on April 11, 2013. The Archdiocese for the Military Services, USA, opened a cause for his canonization in 1993, granting him the status "Servant of God". Pope Francis gave him the title "Venerable" in 2025.
Portrait of Vincent Capodanno in suit.	Vincent R. Capodanno †	United States Navy	1st Marine Division	Catholic	Operation Swift	September 4, 1967	Capodanno served with the Marine Corps and ministered under heavy fire during Operation Swift, disregarding his own injuries. He was killed while attempting to minister to a corpsman approximately 15 yards (14 m) from an enemy machine gun.
Portrait of Charles Watters. He is in military uniform and wears spectacles.	Charles J. Watters †	United States Army	173rd Support Battalion	Catholic	Battle of Dak To	November 19, 1967	Watters was on the front line under heavy fire during the Battle of Dak To, ministering to and rescuing soldiers with "complete disregard for his safety". He was killed by friendly fire from an American bomber.
Portrait of Angelo Liteky, a male in military uniform with slight widow's peaks.	Charles Liteky	United States Army	199th Infantry Brigade	Catholic	Near Phuoc-Lac, Biên Hòa province, Vietnam	December 6, 1967	Liteky rescued 23 wounded men without protective gear during an ambush in 1967. He left the Catholic priesthood in 1975 and renounced his Medal of Honor in 1986, leaving it in an envelope addressed to Ronald Reagan, as an act of protest against American foreign policy. He is believed to be the only recipient to renounce the medal for political reasons.

=== Chaplain assistants ===
Chaplain assistants
Image	Name	Service	Unit	Religion	Place of action	Date of action	Notes/References
Portrait of Calvin Titus, a young man with dark hair in military uniform	Calvin Pearl Titus	United States Army	14th Infantry Regiment	Wesleyan	Battle of Peking	August 14, 1900	Titus was a bugler in the 14th Infantry Regiment. He provided music for religious services in the unit, and became the unofficial assistant to unit chaplain Leslie Groves Sr. He scaled a wall along the eastern side of Peking to lay down suppressing fire on the enemy from above. He commissioned as an officer in 1905 and became an ordained minister in 1909. Titus was unable to become a chaplain, however, due to his denomination not being recognized by the Army at the time. He became an official chaplain assistant in the year the position was introduced.
