= Francis B. Hall =

American Civil War Medal of Honor recipient (1827–1903)

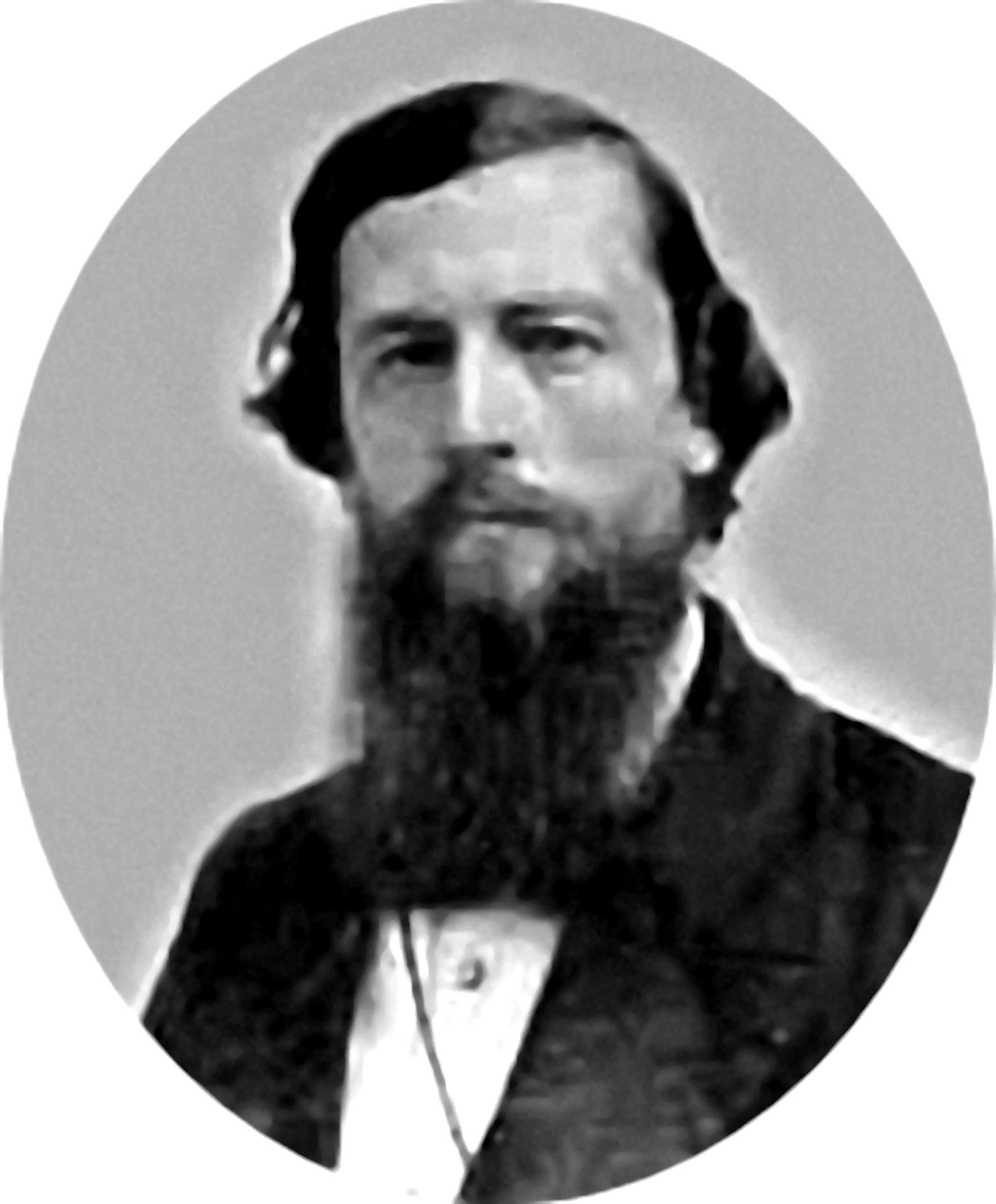
- Hall in 1865
- Born: November 16, 1827; New York
- Died: October 4, 1903 (aged 75)
- Burial place: Plattsburgh, New York
- Military career
- Allegiance: United States
- Branch: United States Army
- Service years: 1862–1863
- Rank: Chaplain
- Unit: 16th New York Volunteer Infantry Regiment
- Conflicts: American Civil War; Battle of Salem Church
- Awards: Medal of Honor

Francis Bloodgood Hall (November 16, 1827 – October 4, 1903) was an American Union Army soldier in the American Civil War who received the U.S. military's highest decoration, the Medal of Honor.

Hall was born in New York on November 16, 1827, and entered service at Plattsburgh, New York in October 1862. He was awarded the Medal of Honor, for extraordinary heroism shown on May 3, 1863, at the Battle of Salem Church, while serving as a Chaplain with the 16th New York Volunteer Infantry Regiment. He mustered out with his regiment a few weeks later. His Medal of Honor was issued on February 16, 1897.

Hall died at the age of 75, on October 4, 1903, and was buried at Riverside Cemetery in Plattsburgh, New York.

== Medal of Honor citation ==
The President of the United States of America, in the name of Congress, takes pleasure in presenting the Medal of Honor to Chaplain Francis Bloodgood Hall, United States Army, for extraordinary heroism on 3 May 1863, while serving with 16th New York Infantry, in action at Salem Heights, Fredericksburg, Virginia. Chaplain Hall voluntarily exposed himself to a heavy fire during the thickest of the fight and carried wounded men to the rear for treatment and attendance.

== See also ==
- List of Chaplain Corps Medal of Honor recipients
