= John M. Whitehead (soldier) =

American Civil War Medal of Honor recipient (1823–1909)

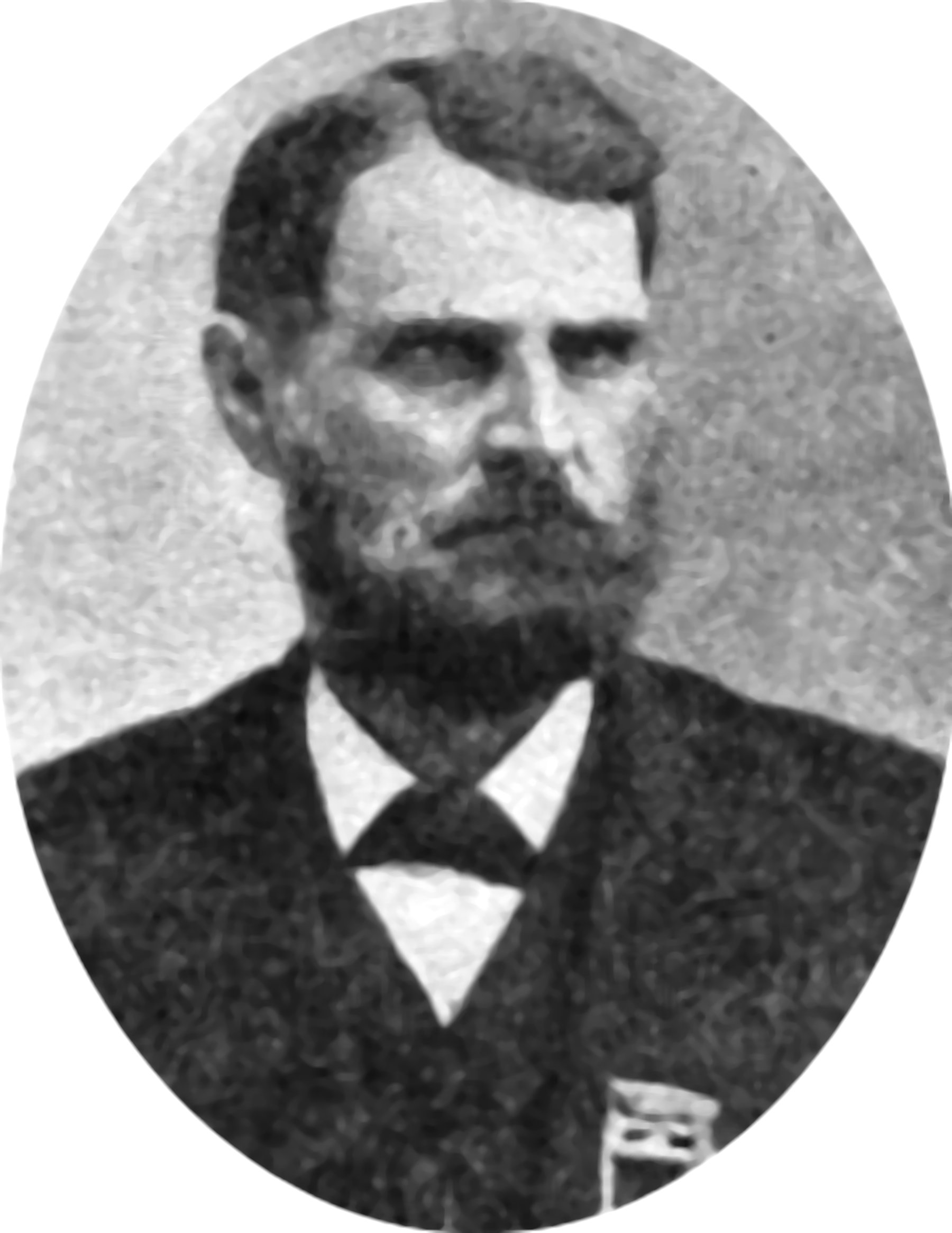
- Born: March 6, 1823; Wayne County, Indiana
- Died: March 8, 1909 (aged 86); Topeka, Kansas
- Burial place: Topeka Cemetery, Topeka, Kansas
- Spouse: Mary Whitehead
- Children: John W. Whitehead
- Military career
- Rank: Chaplain
- Unit: 15th Indiana Volunteer Infantry Regiment
- Conflicts: Battle of Stones River, Murfreesboro, Tennessee
- Awards: Medal of Honor

John Milton Whitehead (March 6, 1823 - March 8, 1909) was an American chaplain who received the Medal of Honor for his actions in the American Civil War.

== Biography ==
Whitehead was born in Wayne County, Indiana on March 6, 1823. He was ordained as Baptist Minister at age 21 before the war and would continue working in that profession after the war.

He served as a chaplain in the 15th Indiana Volunteer Infantry Regiment during the Civil War after enlisting at Westville, Indiana at age 39. He earned his medal in action at Battle of Stones River, Murfreesboro, Tennessee on December 31, 1862.

Whitehead was married to Mary with whom he had a son named John. He also had a sister named Linda. He moved to Kansas in the 1880s and stayed in Silver and eventually Topeka. He helped found the First Baptist Church in Topeka. Whitehead received his Medal of Honor on April 4, 1898. Whitehead died in Topeka, Kansas on March 8, 1909, and is now buried in Topeka Cemetery, Topeka, Kansas.

== See also ==
- List of Chaplain Corps Medal of Honor recipients
