= James W. Larrabee =

Medal of Honor recipient (1839–1907)

- Born: 1839; Rensselaer County, New York
- Died: December 30, 1907 (aged 67–68)
- Burial place: Meriden, Illinois
- Military career
- Allegiance: United States of America; Union
- Branch: United States Army; Union Army
- Service years: 1861 - 1865
- Rank: First Sergeant
- Units: Company I, 55th Illinois Volunteer Infantry Regiment
- Conflicts: American Civil War
- Awards: Medal of Honor

James W. Larrabee (1839 – December 30, 1907) was a soldier in the Union Army and a Medal of Honor recipient for his actions during the Siege of Vicksburg in the American Civil War.

Larrabee joined the 55th Illinois Infantry in October 1861, and was mustered out in August 1865.

== Medal of Honor citation ==
Rank and organization: Corporal, Company I, 55th Illinois Infantry. Place and date: At Vicksburg, Miss., May 22, 1863. Entered service at: Mendota, Ill. Birth: Rensselaer County, N.Y. Date of issue: September 2, 1893.

Medal of Honor and his portrait are available for viewing here

Citation:

Gallantry in the charge of the "volunteer storming party."

== See also ==
- List of American Civil War Medal of Honor recipients: A–F
