= John Warden =

- Born: June 11, 1841; Cook County, Illinois, US
- Died: July 2, 1906 (aged 65); Washington, US
- Burial place: Orting Town Cemetery, Orting, Washington
- Military career
- Allegiance: United States; Union
- Branch: United States Army; Union Army
- Service years: 1861 - 1865
- Rank: First Lieutenant
- Units: Company E, 55th Illinois Volunteer Infantry Regiment
- Conflicts: American Civil War • Siege of Vicksburg
- Awards: Medal of Honor

John Warden (June 11, 1841 – July 2, 1906) was a Union Army soldier during the American Civil War. He received the Medal of Honor for conspicuous gallantry during the May 22, 1863 Siege of Vicksburg.

Warden joined the 55th Illinois Infantry in September 1861, and was mustered out in August 1865.

== Union assault ==
On May 22, 1863, General Ulysses S. Grant ordered an assault on the Confederate heights at Vicksburg, Mississippi. The plan called for a storming party of volunteers to build a bridge across a moat and plant scaling ladders against the enemy embankment in advance of the main attack. The volunteers knew the odds were against survival and the mission was called, in nineteenth century vernacular, a "forlorn hope". Only single men were accepted as volunteers and even then, twice as many men as needed came forward and were turned away. The assault began in the early morning following a naval bombardment.

The Union soldiers came under enemy fire immediately and were pinned down in the ditch they were to cross. Despite repeated attacks by the main Union body, the men of the forlorn hope were unable to retreat until nightfall. Of the 150 men in the storming party, nearly half were killed. Seventy-nine of the survivors were awarded the Medal of Honor.

== Medal of Honor citation ==
For conspicuous gallantry in action at Vicksburg, Miss., May 22, 1863.

== See also ==
- List of Medal of Honor recipients
- List of American Civil War Medal of Honor recipients: T–Z

== Notes ==
- "Civil War (M-Z); Warden, John entry". Medal of Honor recipients. United States Army Center of Military History. August 6, 2009. Archived from the original on February 23, 2009.
- "John Warden". Hall of Valor. Military Times.
- "A Forlorn Hope". Archived from the original on October 11, 2010.
