= Milton L. Haney =

Milton Lorenzo Haney
- Born: January 23, 1825; Savannah, Ohio
- Died: January 20, 1922 (aged 96); California
- Burial place: Mountain View Cemetery, Altadena, California
- Military career
- Allegiance: United States of America; Union
- Branch: United States Army; Union Army
- Service years: 1861 – 1864
- Rank: Chaplain
- Nickname: "The Fighting Chaplain"
- Unit: 55th Illinois Volunteer Infantry
- Conflicts: American Civil War
- Awards: Medal of Honor

Milton Lorenzo Haney (January 23, 1825 – January 20, 1922) was a regimental chaplain in the United States Army.

== Biography ==
Haney was born in Savannah, Ohio in 1825. He credited the home life of his mother as being the greatest human factor leading to his salvation. In 1846, he received appointment as the junior preacher of the Dixon, Illinois, Circuit. At first his work centered in southern Illinois, but he quickly expanded, preaching in churches and camp meetings throughout the Midwestern states.

He entered U.S. Army at Bushnell, Illinois as a captain in charge of Company F, 55th Illinois Volunteer Infantry Regiment, and was appointed chaplain of the regiment in March 1862.

Four men earned Medals of Honor in action against Confederate forces at Atlanta, Georgia on July 21–22, 1864. Among these four heroes was Milton Haney, sometimes called "The Fighting Chaplain" by the men of the 55th Illinois Infantry. When the tide of battle was critical on July 22, Chaplain Haney voluntarily joined the ranks of his regiment, as noted in his citation. He mustered out in December of that year.

In the late 1890s, Haney's chronic health problems worsened, and he began applying for an increase in his military pension. One document in his pension file is a petition drawn up and signed by 21 members of the 55th Regiment, Co. F, Illinois Volunteer Infantry, who had served with him and supported his claim for "Invalid Pension." Haney was receiving $30 per month in 1915. After further correspondence with the "Pension Commissioner" he was awarded an increase. His pension payments of $60 per month ceased when he died three days short of his 97th birthday.

Haney died at the age of 96 in California on January 20, 1922, after suffering a severe attack of pneumonia. He is buried in Mountain View Cemetery, Altadena, California.

== Medal of Honor citation ==
Rank and organization: Chaplain, 55th Illinois Infantry. Place and date: At Atlanta, Ga., July 22, 1864. Entered service at: Bushnell, Ill. Birth: Ohio. Date of issue: November 3, 1896.

Citation:

Voluntarily carried a musket in the ranks of his regiment and rendered heroic service in retaking the Federal works which had been captured by the enemy.

== See also ==
- List of Chaplain Corps Medal of Honor recipients
- List of Medal of Honor recipients
- List of American Civil War Medal of Honor recipients: G–L
- Battle of Atlanta
- 55th Illinois Volunteer Infantry Regiment
