= Horford =

Horford is a surname. Notable people with the surname include:

- Al Horford (born 1986), Dominican Republic basketball player
- Jon Horford (born 1991), American basketball player
- Tito Horford (born 1966), Dominican Republic basketball player

== See also ==
- Morford
