= James Hill (Medal of Honor, 1863) =

American Civil War Medal of Honor recipient

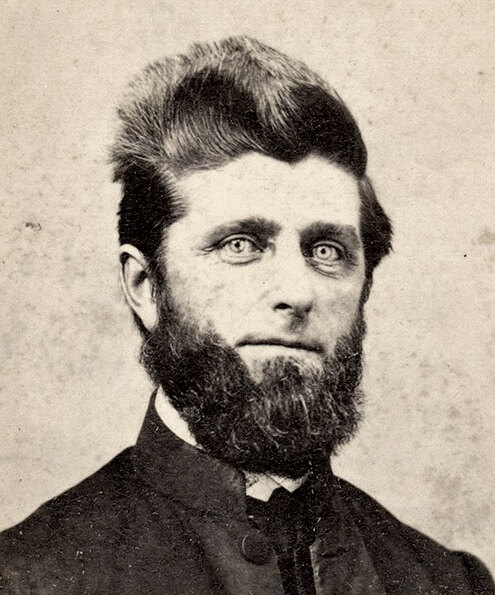
- Born: December 6, 1822; England
- Died: September 22, 1899 (aged 76); Cascade, Iowa
- Burial place: Cascade Community Cemetery; Cascade, Iowa
- Military career
- Allegiance: United States of America; Union
- Branch: United States Army; Union Army
- Rank: First Lieutenant
- Units: Company C, 21st Iowa Volunteer Infantry Regiment
- Conflicts: American Civil War
- Awards: Medal of Honor

James Hill (December 6, 1822 – September 22, 1899) was a soldier in the United States Army during the American Civil War. He received the Medal of Honor.

== Biography ==
Hill was born on December 6, 1822, in England.

On May 16, 1863, at Champion Hills, Miss., on May 16, 1863, as a First Lieutenant, Company I, 21st Iowa Infantry. He was "Rev. Hill" before the war, but gave up his church to enlist as a Private. He was later promoted to Lieutenant, and was acting as his unit's quartermaster in command of a party of foragers during the action for which he was awarded his medal. He was later reassigned as Chaplain for the regiment, the title shown on his Medal of Honor plaque.

Hill died on September 22, 1899, and was buried in Cascade Community Cemetery, in Cascade, Iowa.

== Medal of Honor citation ==
Rank and organization: First Lieutenant, CompanyI, 21st Iowa Volunteer Infantry. Place and date: At Champion Hills, Miss., on May 16, 1863.

Citation:

By skillful and brave management captured 3 of the enemy's pickets.

== See also ==
- List of Chaplain Corps Medal of Honor recipients
- List of Medal of Honor recipients
- List of American Civil War Medal of Honor recipients: G–L
