= Robert M. Cox =

American Civil War Medal of Honor recipient

Robert Mitchell Cox
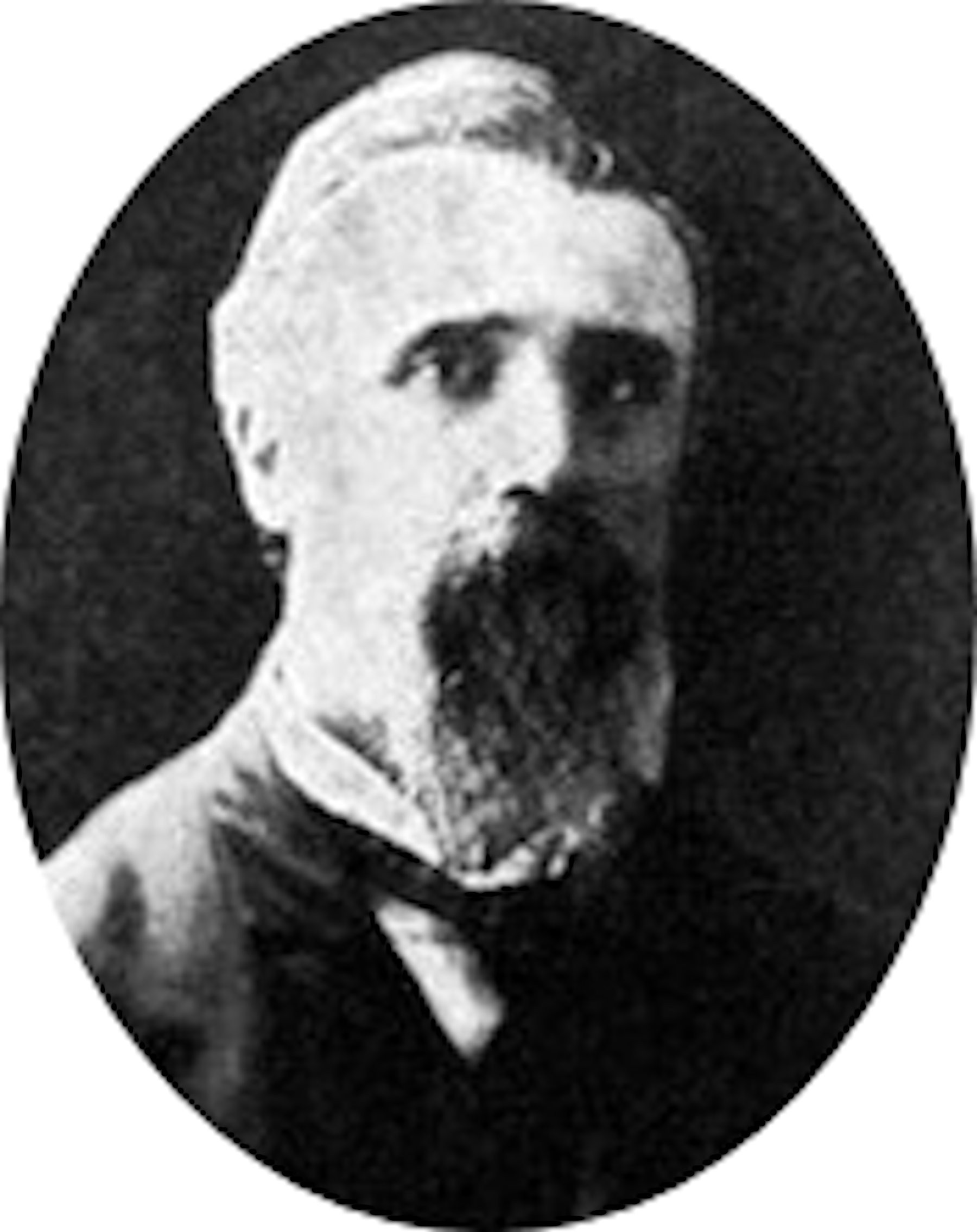
- Cox in 1895
- Born: March 19, 1845; Guernsey County, Ohio
- Died: October 26, 1932 (aged 87); Prairie City, Illinois
- Burial place: Prairie City Cemetery
- Military career
- Allegiance: United States of America
- Branch: United States Army
- Rank: Corporal
- Unit: 55th Illinois Volunteer Infantry Regiment - Company K
- Conflicts: Battle of Vicksburg
- Awards: Medal of Honor

Corporal Robert M. Cox (March 19, 1845 – October 26, 1932) was an American soldier who fought in the American Civil War. Cox received the country's highest award for bravery during combat, the Medal of Honor, for his action during the Battle of Vicksburg in Mississippi on May 22, 1863. He was honored with the award on December 31, 1892.

== Biography ==
Cox was born in Guernsey County, Ohio, on March 19, 1845, to William Cox and Mary Carver. He married Sara Bryt and had the following children: Minnie Cox, Arminda Cox, Lida Cox, Eliza Cox, Jessie Cox, Ella Cox, Robert Cox, Christine Cox, and Delena Cox. He enlisted into the 55th Illinois Infantry during the American Civil War. He died on October 26, 1932, and his remains are interred at the Prairie City Cemetery in Illinois.

== Medal of Honor citation ==
Bravely defended the colors planted on the outward parapet of Fort Hill.

== See also ==
- List of American Civil War Medal of Honor recipients: A–F
