= Robert Cox (Florida politician) =

American state legislator in Florida

Robert Cox (born September 12, 1828) was an American state legislator in Florida. He was from Alabama and moved to Florida before the American Civil War. He represented Leon County, Florida in the Florida House of Representatives from 1868 to 1870. He owned substantial property and had a son Benjamin who was a post office route agent.

Cox was documented as being "mulatto". He worked as a carpenter. He served in the Committee on Corporations with W. W. Moore. He lived in Tallahassee, the state capital.

== See also ==
- African American officeholders from the end of the Civil War until before 1900
