= 55th Illinois Infantry Regiment =

55th Illinois Infantry Regiment, U.S. Volunteers
- Illinois state flag
- Active: October 31, 1861, to August 14, 1865
- Country: United States
- Allegiance: Union
- Branch: Infantry
- Nickname: "Canton Rifles"
- Engagements: Battle of Shiloh; Siege of Corinth; Vicksburg Campaign; Battle of Chickasaw Bayou; Battle of Fort Hindman (Arkansas Post); Battle of Snyder's Bluff; Battle of Jackson (MS); Battle of Champion Hill; Siege of Vicksburg; Battle of Collierville; Third Battle of Chattanooga; Atlanta campaign; Battle of Resaca; Battle of Kennesaw Mountain; Battle of Atlanta; Battle of Ezra Church; Battle of Jonesborough; Battle of Allatoona Pass; March to the Sea; Battle of Fort McAllister (1864); Carolinas campaign; Battle of Bentonville

The 55th Illinois Volunteer Infantry Regiment was an infantry regiment that served in the Union Army during the American Civil War. The regiment is sometimes referred to as the Canton Rifles or the Douglas Brigade 2nd Regiment.

== Service ==
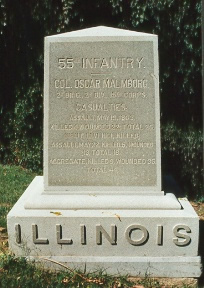
Monument to the 55th Illinois Infantry and Oscar Malmborg at Vicksburg.

The 55th Illinois Infantry was organized at Camp Douglas, Chicago, Illinois and mustered into Federal service on October 31, 1861. The men were recruited in northern Illinois counties- LaSalle, Fulton, Grundy, Ogle, Winnebago, DeKalb, DuPage, Kane, McDonough, Carroll, and Knox. Some of the early enlistees helped build Camp Douglas.

The regiment traveled by train and boat from Chicago to St. Louis, where training continued at Benton Barracks, Missouri. The regiment then shipped to Paducah, Kentucky. Due to a lack of working armaments, the regiment was unable to take part in the capture of Fort Donelson or Fort Henry.

The regiment first saw active service at the Battle of Shiloh, April 6th and 7th, 1862, also known as the Battle of Pittsburg Landing. It was deployed in the south-eastern part of the battlefield and after a prolonged stand against Confederate forces in wooded ravines, was pushed back to Pittsburg Landing by nightfall. Grant then reorganized the troops and the regiment participated in the second day of fighting. It then advanced to Corinth and ultimately to Memphis in July 1862, where they participated in foraging expeditions and in the Battle of Arkansas Post.

The 55th proceeded south towards Vicksburg and participated in the Battle of Chickasaw Bayou in December 1862. It was part of Sherman's Yazoo Expedition, attempting to bypass Vicksburg. The regiment took part in the attacks on Vicksburg's defenses on May 19th and May 22nd, 1862, at the location known as the Forlorn Hope.

=== The Letters of William J. Kennedy ===
William Kennedy was one of the first private soldiers in Company G, 55th Illinois Infantry, recruiting his brother, brother-in-law and other friends into the company. Kennedy, a harness-maker residing in LaSalle, Illinois at the outbreak of the war, wrote many letters to his wife Jane and other family members and friends. Kennedy was able to observe and record the movements of Grant's army of the Tennessee, and document in detail life in the Western theater of war. Kennedy was wounded in the assault on May 22nd 1863, when he attempted to bring ammunition to his company. He was taken by hospital boat to the Gayoso Hospital in Memphis where he died on June 22nd 1863.

=== Siege of Atlanta and Sherman's March to the Sea ===
The 55th remained under the command of Sherman until the end of the war, seeing action at Kennesaw Mountain as well as other significant battles. The regiment was mustered out on August 14, 1865.

== Total strength and casualties ==
The regiment suffered casualties including nine officers, 149 enlisted men who were killed in action, or mortally wounded, and two officers and 127 enlisted men who died of disease, for a total of 286 fatalities.

== Commanders ==
- Colonel David Stuart - promoted to brigadier general on November 29, 1862, U.S. Senate refused to confirm appointment, resigned April 3, 1863
- Colonel Oscar Malmborg

== Notable members ==
- Corporal James W. Larrabee, Company I — Medal of Honor for "Gallantry in the charge of the "volunteer storming party."" or "forlorn hope." at Vicksburg, MS - 22 May 1863
- Corporal Robert M. Cox, Company K — Defended the colors planted on the outward parapet of Fort Hill.
- Private Jerome Morford, Company K — Participating in a diversionary "forlorn hope" attack on Confederate defenses, 22 May 1863.
- Private Jacob Sanford, Company K — Participating in the same "forlorn hope."
- First Lieutenant John Warden, Company E — Participating in the same "forlorn hope."
- Chaplain (Lieutenant Colonel) Milton L. Haney, Regimental Chaplain — The "Fighting Chaplain" received the Medal of Honor for his actions in the Battle of Atlanta, 22 July 1864. Haney was one of only nine chaplains awarded the CMH in American history.

== See also ==
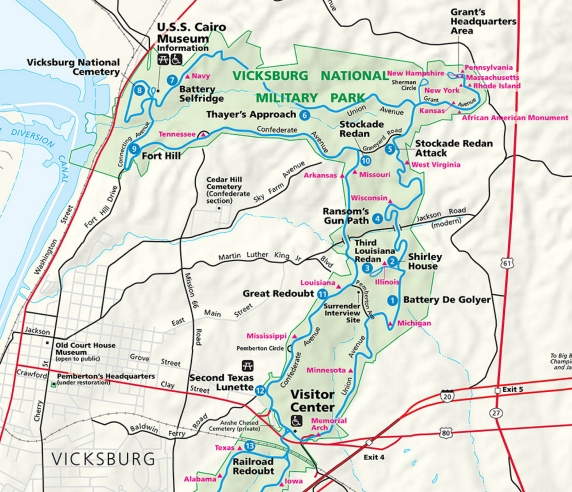
Map of Vicksburg National Military Park.

- Memphis and Charleston Railroad
- Milton L. Haney
- List of Illinois Civil War Units
- Illinois in the American Civil War
