= United States military chaplains =

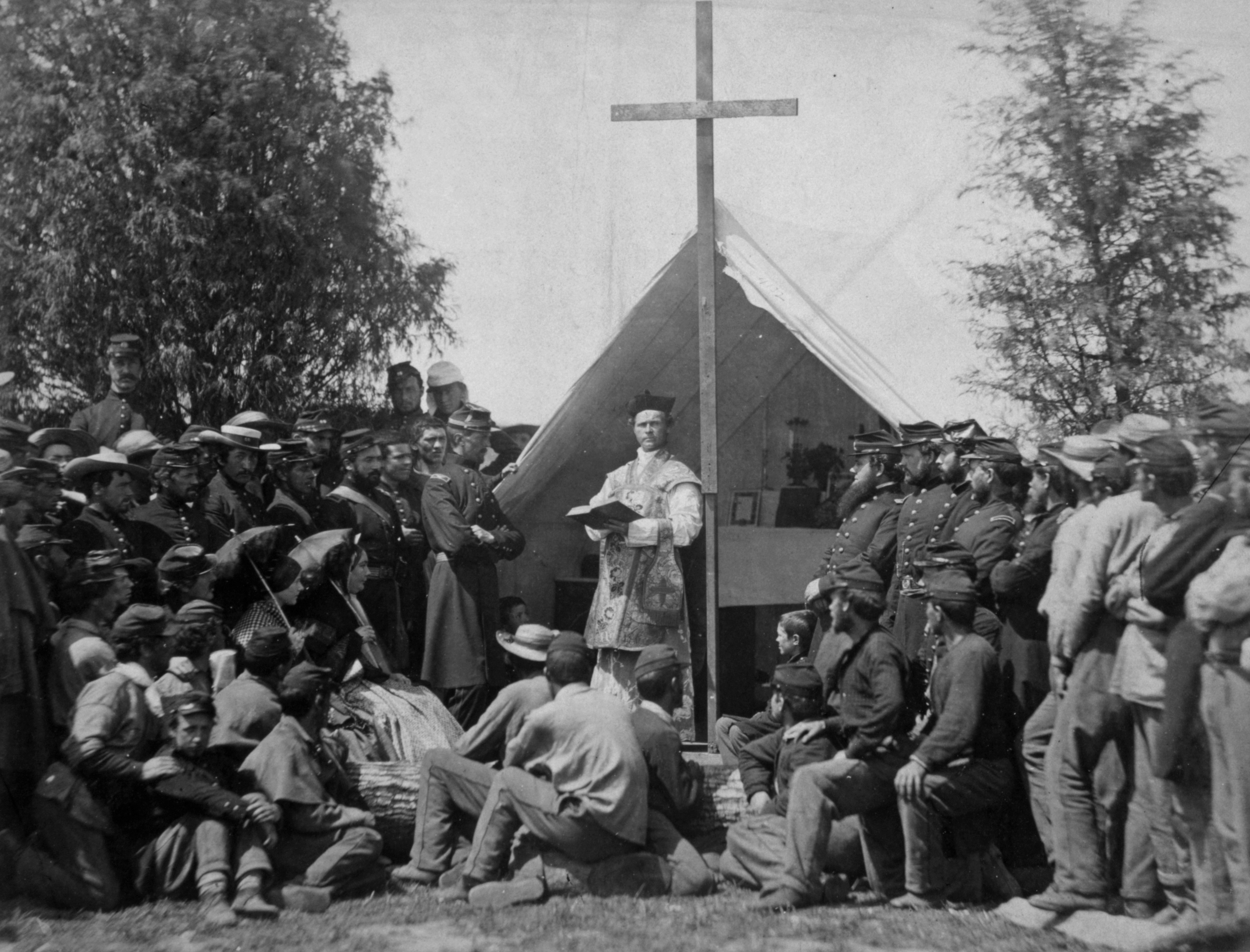
A Roman Catholic army chaplain celebrating a Mass for Union soldiers and officers during the American Civil War (1861–1865).

United States military chaplains hold positions in the armed forces of the United States and are charged with conducting religious services and providing counseling for their adherents. As of 2023, there are about 3,000 chaplains in the United States Armed Forces among the active duty, reserve, and National Guard components.

== Organization ==
Within the United States Department of Defense, the Armed Forces Chaplains Board (AFCB) advises the Secretary of Defense and the Under Secretary of Defense for Personnel and Readiness on religious, ethical, and moral matters, as well as policy issues affecting religious ministry and the free exercise of religion within the military services. The three Chiefs of Chaplains and three active-duty Deputy Chiefs of Chaplains of the Army, Navy, and Air Force are its members.

A military chaplain must be endorsed by a religious organization in order to serve on active duty. In the contemporary U.S. military, endorsement is a complex area and many different paths are available. This religious endorsement must be maintained throughout the chaplain's military service and can be withdrawn at any time for religious or disciplinary reasons by the religious body with which the chaplain is affiliated, though provisions exist for exceptional cases. A military chaplain's rank is based on years of service and promotion selection from the appropriate peer group. Each is identified in uniform both by rank and religious affiliation insignia that indicate as well the branch of service. Chaplains should be referred to as "chaplain" and not captain or major and in written documents that rank would be written as CH (Capt.) for example.

== History ==
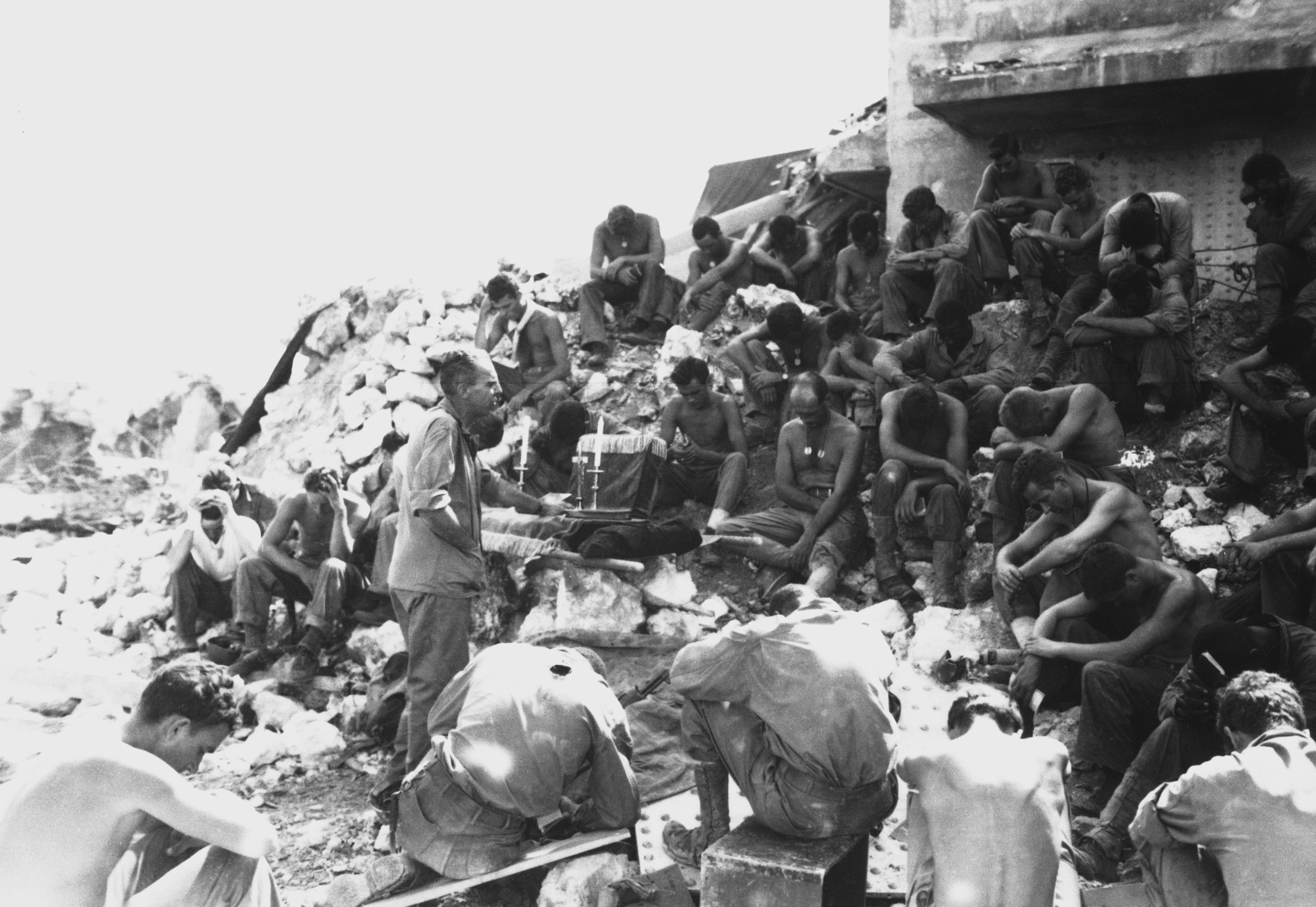
Protestant service on Peleliu, 1944

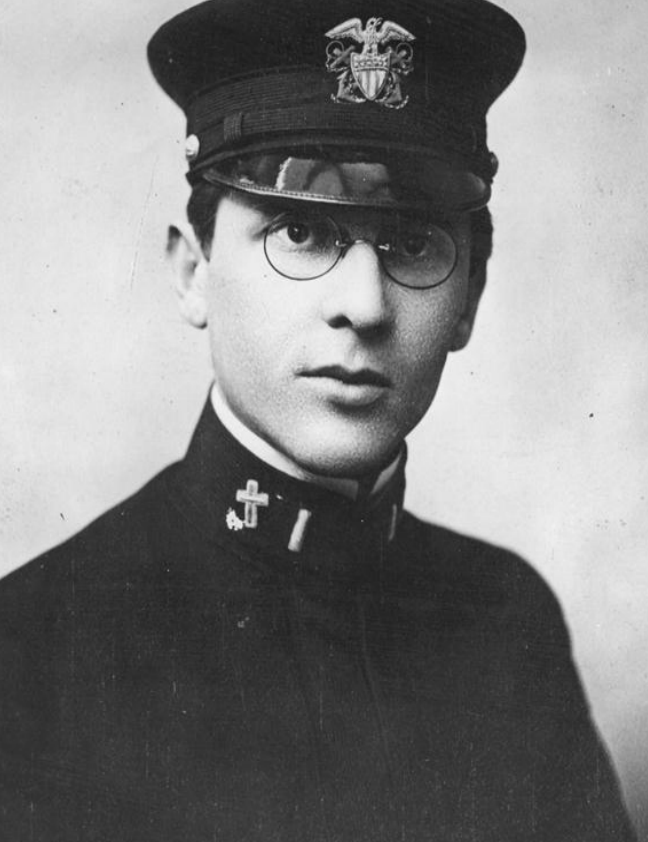
Ensign David Goldberg

Chaplains have served in the various branches of the United States armed forces since their formation. On 28 October 1778, Rev. Benjamin Balch reported to the frigate USS Boston as the first chaplain of the Continental Navy. He served on the ship until it was captured by the British in 1780. Congress authorized the hiring of an army chaplain in 1791. Reverend John Hurt of Virginia (who had served as Chaplain of the 6th Virginia Regiment during the American Revolution) was appointed to the position of Chaplain of the Continental Army on 4 March 1791, and became the first officially recognized United States military chaplain. He served until his resignation of 30 April 1794. He was succeeded by Reverend David Jones of Pennsylvania who was also a veteran of service with the Continental Army during the American Revolution. Jones served until he was discharged on 15 June 1800. He later served as a chaplain during the War of 1812. Prior to 1846, only Protestants were allowed to be chaplains in the US Army or US Navy. In the Mexican-American War, a large number of Irish and German Catholic immigrants fought in the Army and President James Polk worked with New York Archbishop John Hughes to institute Catholic chaplains - the first were two Jesuits John McElroy and Anthony Rey. Until 1862, only Christians were allowed to be chaplains in the US Army. After a lobbying campaign, the law was changed and President Lincoln appointed Rabbi Jacob Frankel of Philadelphia as the first Jewish chaplain on 18 September 1862. The first female chaplain in the United States military was Ella Elvira Gibson, she served in the American Civil War but she was not paid until 1876, and not recognized as a chaplain until 2001, when she was also posthumously given the rank of captain. The US Navy did not have Jewish chaplains until Rabbi David Goldberg was commissioned in 1917.

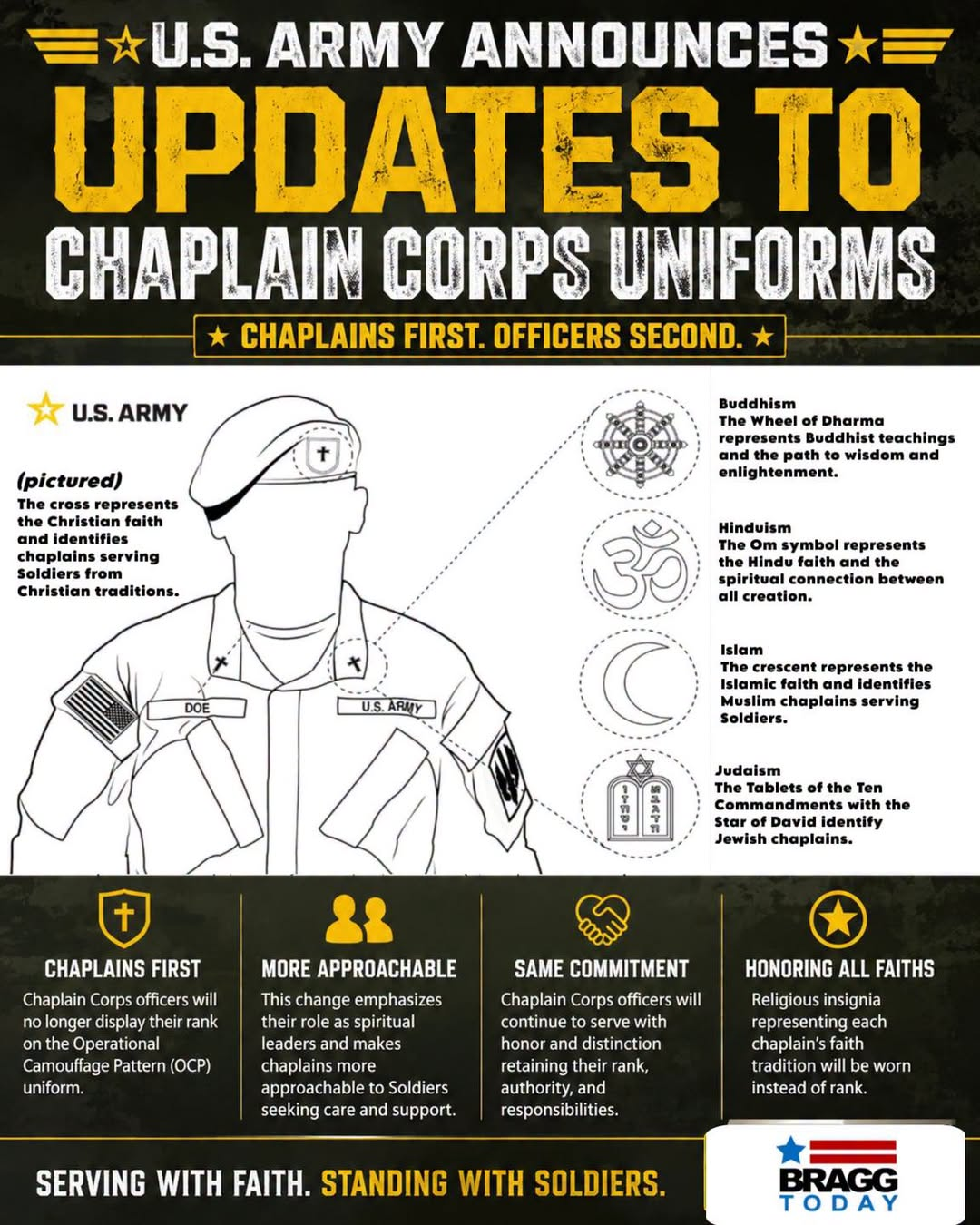
US Army Updated Chaplain Corps Uniform Guidance

Chaplains generally wore no insignia of rank, but were treated as captains in the army or lieutenants in the navy. Navy chaplains began wearing navy uniforms with rank insignia in 1876. Army chaplains originally wore only a silver shepherds crook and in 1917 a silver cross as their insignia of branch. Beginning in 1914, chaplains were allowed to wear the insignia of grade starting as a first lieutenant in the army, but in 1918 the uniform orders removed the grade insignia - but some chaplains continued to wear it anyway. The insignia returned in 1926 and was worn until 2026. On 23 June 2026 the Secretary of the Army issued new directives for chaplains stating that they will no longer wear their rank insignia on the Army Combat Uniform (ACU) but instead wear their branch insignia, now on the collars. Army chaplains will continue to wear rank insignia on the Army Green Service Uniform or the Army Service Uniform as well as mess dress.

On 24 March 2026, Secretary of Defense Pete Hegseth stated that all military chaplains would no longer wear insignia of grade and that it would be replaced by the insignia of their religious affiliation. They would continue to be treated as officers and retain an officer's rank. The United States Navy would be the first service to put the secretary's order into regulations on 9 June 2026. Navy (which also provides chaplains to the Coast Guard and Marine Corps) chaplains will not wear rank insignia on Navy working uniforms, coveralls, flight suites and 2-piece organizational uniforms including all covers (hats). Chaplains will only wear their insignia of branch (denomination) in these uniforms. Navy chaplains will continue to wear rank insignia in dress or service uniforms.

General Carl Spaatz, the first Air Force Chief of Staff, ordered the institution of a separate Air Force chaplaincy on May 10, 1949. The U.S. Space Force does not have their own chaplaincy and depends on the U.S. Air Force for chaplains. On June 15, 2026, the Air Force issued a memorandum of guidance for chaplain uniform reform stating that chaplains will remove insignia of rank and replace it with the chaplain insignia on all Operational Camouflage Pattern (OCP) uniforms and patrol caps. It further stated that this will not alter customs and courtesies.

The U.S. Marine Corps and the U.S. Coast Guard do not have their own chaplaincies, but are served by the Navy Chaplain Corps.

== Controversies ==
=== Expanding role of military chaplains ===
In 1999, Rabbi Arnold E. Resnicoff, a U.S. Navy chaplain, proposed widening the chaplain's role to include that of engagement with local religious leaders in conflict zones to improve the military's understanding of local religious issues and include chaplains in the conflict prevention and reconciliation processes. This outreach is part of the duties listed for chaplains in Joint Publication 1-05 on chaplain operations.

=== Constitutionality ===
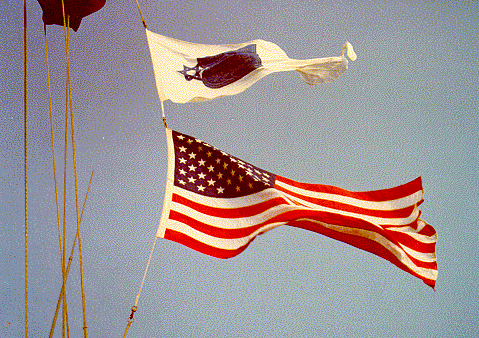
Jewish Worship Pennant, flying over the National Ensign (American flag) on a U.S. Navy ship.

Two Harvard law students brought a suit in 1979 arguing that military chaplains should be replaced with non-combat volunteers or contractors. In Katcoff v. Marsh (1985), the U.S. Court of Appeals for the Second Circuit determined that the plaintiffs lacked standing to bring the suit and upheld the right of the military to employ chaplains. According to one analysis of the case, the court analysis described the First Amendment's Free Exercise Clause and Establishment Clause as separate issues. It noted that only the wealthiest religious sects could provide chaplains for their adherents, effectively denying to other military personnel the "free exercise" of their religion. The court also established guidelines for the military's chaplaincy programs, emphasizing the constitutional boundaries governing the program's administration and operations, including accommodating the rights and beliefs of each service member, and the avoidance of evangelizing and involuntary participation in religious observances.

Outside of the court system, some legal scholars and religious groups feel that they can not serve their worshipers inside the military system and that the courts misinterpreted the establishment clause.

=== Restrictions on religious observance or expression ===
A 14 September 2006, court-martial resulted in a reprimand and fine for U.S. Navy Chaplain Lieutenant Gordon Klingenschmitt, a Protestant, who participated in uniform at a March 2006 protest in front of the White House, though he had been given a direct order not to wear his uniform. The protest was in support of his and other chaplains' complaint that the military restricted the free exercise of their religion by allowing only non-sectarian prayers at public ceremonies.

=== Denominational favoritism ===
In August 2002, the U.S. District Court for the District of Columbia granted class action status to a lawsuit on the part of 17 evangelical Protestant chaplains who challenged the Navy's chaplain-selection criteria. They argued that the Navy adhered to a promotion formula that underrepresented "non-liturgical" Protestant chaplains by allotting positions in three equal parts—liturgical Protestant denominations such as Methodists, Lutherans, Episcopalians, and Presbyterians; Catholics; and non-liturgical Protestant denominations such as Baptists, evangelicals, Bible churches, Pentecostals, charismatics, and other faiths—although non-liturgical Protestants constitute far more than one-third of the Navy's service members.

In April 2007, the court held in Larsen v. United States Navy that the Navy had abandoned the thirds policy and that its current criteria were constitutional because the Navy has broad discretion to determine how to accommodate the religious needs of its service members. This decision was affirmed in 2013 by the United States Court of Appeals for the District of Columbia Circuit in Chaplaincy of Full Gospel Churches v. United States Navy that the chaplains did not prove harm.

In 2017, Asst. Secretary of Defense Lernes J. Hebert issue a memorandum creating 211 faith and belief codes to be used to identify service personnel and "accurately track more faith and belief systems." In 2026, Undersecretary of Defense Anthony J. Tata issued a new memorandum eliminating 180 of the faith codes. “The new list will provide chaplains with clear, readily available information that will better enable them to anticipate the religious support needs of service members and to provide religious support activities that align with service members’ personal faith and practices,” Tata wrote. Chaplains and former chaplains spoke under conditions of anonymity stated that it gives too much priority to Christian denominations and also doesn't take consideration of denominational differences within Christian sects. Utah Senators Mike Lee (R) and John Curtis (R) criticized the fact that the LDS church was left off the list of Christian denominations and listed separately. Pentagon spokesman Sean Parnell stated the list was not an official approved list of religions, but was to simplify the work of military chaplains.

The remaining 31 denominations are: Agnostic, Baha'i, Buddhism, Christian (Assemblies of God, Baptist, Brethren, Catholic, Church of Christ, Church of God, Church of the Nazarene, Episcopal/Anglican, Evangelical, Jehovah's Witness, Lutheran, Methodist, Non Denominational, Orthodox, Pentecostal, Presbyterian, Quaker, Reformed, Scientist, Seventh Day Adventist, Other), Church of Jesus Christ of Latter Day Saints, Hindu, Islam, Judaism, Sikh, Other Religions, No Religion.

The Pentagon removed Christian indicator from the group of 21 denominations after criticism from Utah Senators Lee and Curtis, stating the "mistake has been fixed."

=== Proselytizing ===
Numerous complaints have been made against chaplains for mandatory prayers, coercion, and using government money to promote Evangelical Christianity. Atheists, whose religious position would not be represented by references to a generic God or in the "spiritual fitness" initiatives of the Army, have created groups to ensure the separation of church and state in the military. Groups representing atheists have advocated the appointment of a non-believer to the chaplaincy.

=== Sexual orientation ===
During the 1992 presidential campaign, the possibility of allowing gays and lesbians to serve openly in the U.S. military became a political issue. During the summer, Captain Larry H. Ellis, a Navy chaplain, sent senior military officers and senior chaplains his analysis that said: "In the unique, intensely close environment of the military, homosexual conduct can threaten the lives, including the physical (e.g. AIDS) and psychological well-being of others". He called the presence of homosexuals in the military a "physical and psychological" threat. Advocates of the policy objected that the Department of Defense might exploit Ellis' role as a chaplain in opposing the policy: "It's as if the religious attribution somehow gives their argument more credibility."

Chaplain groups and religious organizations took various positions on "Don't ask, don't tell" (DADT). Some felt that the policy needed to be withdrawn to make the military more inclusive. The Southern Baptist Convention battled the repeal of DADT, warning that their endorsements for chaplains might be withdrawn if the repeal took place. They took the position that allowing gay men and women to serve in the military without restriction would have a negative impact on the ability of chaplains who think homosexuality is a sin to speak freely regarding their religious beliefs. The Roman Catholic Church called for the retention of the policy, but had no plans to withdraw its priests from serving as military chaplains. Sixty-five retired chaplains signed a letter opposing repeal, stating that repeal would make it impossible for chaplains whose faith teaches that same-sex behavior is immoral to minister to military service members. Other religious organizations and agencies called the repeal of the policy a "non-event" or "non-issue" for chaplains, claiming that chaplains have always supported military service personnel, whether or not they agree with all their actions or beliefs.

In May 2011, revelations that an April Navy memo relating to its DADT training guidelines contemplated allowing same-sex weddings in base chapels and allowing chaplains to officiate if they so chose resulted in a letter of protest from 63 Republican congressman, citing the Defense of Marriage Act (DOMA) as controlling the use of federal property. A Pentagon spokesperson replied that DOMA "does not limit the type of religious ceremonies a chaplain may perform in a chapel on a military installation", and a Navy spokesperson said that "A chaplain can conduct a same-sex ceremony if it is in the tenets of his faith". A few days later the Navy rescinded its earlier instructions "pending additional legal and policy review and interdepartmental coordination."

On 30 September 2011, Under Secretary of Defense Clifford Stanley announced the DOD's policy that military chaplains are allowed to perform same-sex marriages "on or off a military installation" where local law permits them. His memo noted that "a chaplain is not required to participate in or officiate a private ceremony if doing so would be in variance with the tenets of his or her religion" and "a military chaplain's participation in a private ceremony does not constitute an endorsement of the ceremony by DoD". Some religious groups announced that their chaplains would not participate in such weddings, including an organization of evangelical Protestants, the Chaplain Alliance for Religious Liberty and Roman Catholics led by Archbishop Timothy Broglio of the Archdiocese for the Military Services, USA.

=== Free speech ===
A 5 January 1991, letter to the Abilene Reporter-News from Lieutenant Colonel Garland Robertson, a Southern Baptist U.S. Air Force chaplain who had served as a reconnaissance pilot during the Vietnam War, questioned the use of U.S. military force against Iraq. He wrote, "The need to use military force in this circumstance ... is an open issue." When reprimanded, he wrote a lengthy rebuttal that he shared with the press. Air Force officials noted that he identified himself by rank to the newspaper, when he could have written as a private citizen. Robertson's orders to relocate to Germany were canceled. He submitted to three psychological examinations, and was relieved of his pastoral duties. He was honorably discharged without benefits in September 1993 based on a record of "poor leadership". He told the New York Times: "If you're consistent with the teachings of your church, there will always be tensions between being a minister and being an officer". He initiated a lawsuit and lost in both the District Court and the Tenth Circuit Court of Appeals, which found his free speech rights had not been violated, noted that "a chaplain is a member of both military and religious denomination institutions", and reaffirmed the lower court's finding "that the conflict between the Air Force and [Robertson] as an Air Force chaplain does not establish a constitutional violation of the religion clauses."

=== Army Spiritual Fitness Guide and New Age Spirituality ===
On 16 December 2025, Secretary of Defense Pete Hegseth posted a video on social media saying that he was going to overhaul the U.S. military chaplaincy corps by getting rid of the Army Spiritual Fitness Guide because it doesn't focus on God. He went on to say that chaplains have been turned into therapists by political correctness and secular humanism. “There will be a top-down cultural shift, putting spiritual wellbeing on the same footing as mental and physical health, as a first step toward creating a supportive environment for our warriors and their souls,” Hegseth said. He also stated he wanted to streamline religious affiliation coding. Critics complained that Hegseth was trying to push out non-Christian minority religions such as Wiccans and Pagans and promoting spiritual conformity. Atheist groups criticized this as a reversal of positive trends in recent years and harmful to non-Christian service members.

=== Firing of Chief of Chaplains ===
On 2 April 2026, Secretary of Defense Pete Hegseth fired the U.S. Army Chief of Chaplains Chaplain (Maj. Gen.) William Green Jr., with no official explanation. No chief of chaplains has ever been fired by the Pentagon. The secretary has been making a number of changes to how military chaplains operate including scraping denominations from those officially recognized, getting rid of the Army Spiritual Fitness Guide and not allowing chaplains to wear their commissioned officer's rank.

== Chaplain deaths while on active duty ==
Death during service (combat and non-combat)

- Revolutionary War: 25
- War of 1812: 1
- Mexican–American War: 1
- Civil War
  - Union: 117
  - Confederacy: 41
- World War I: 23
- World War II: 182
- Korean War: 13
- Vietnam War: 15
- Iraq and Afghan Wars: 1 (as of September 2010)

== Gallery ==
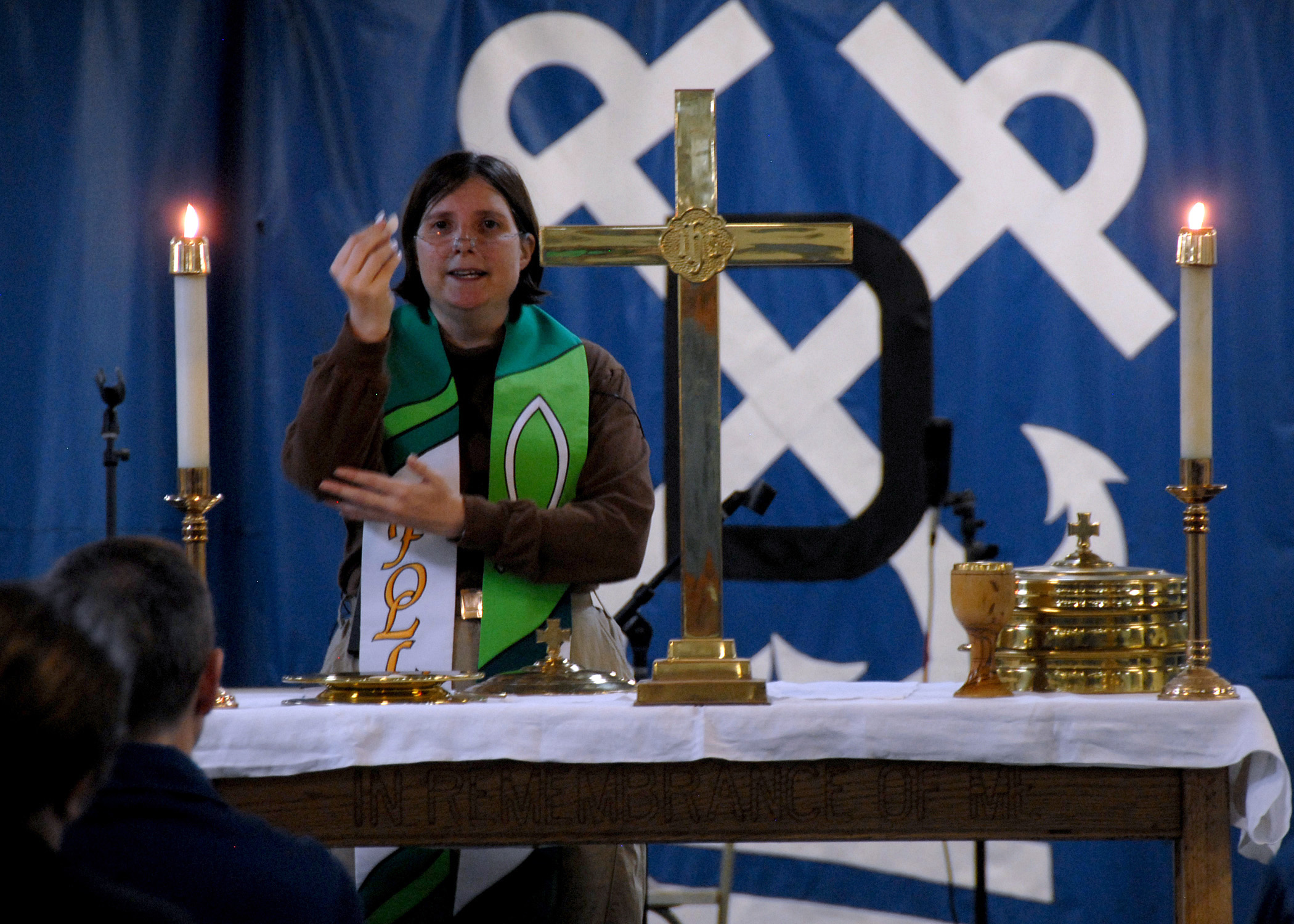
Chaplain Lt. Barbara Wood presides over communion service aboard the USS Abraham Lincoln.

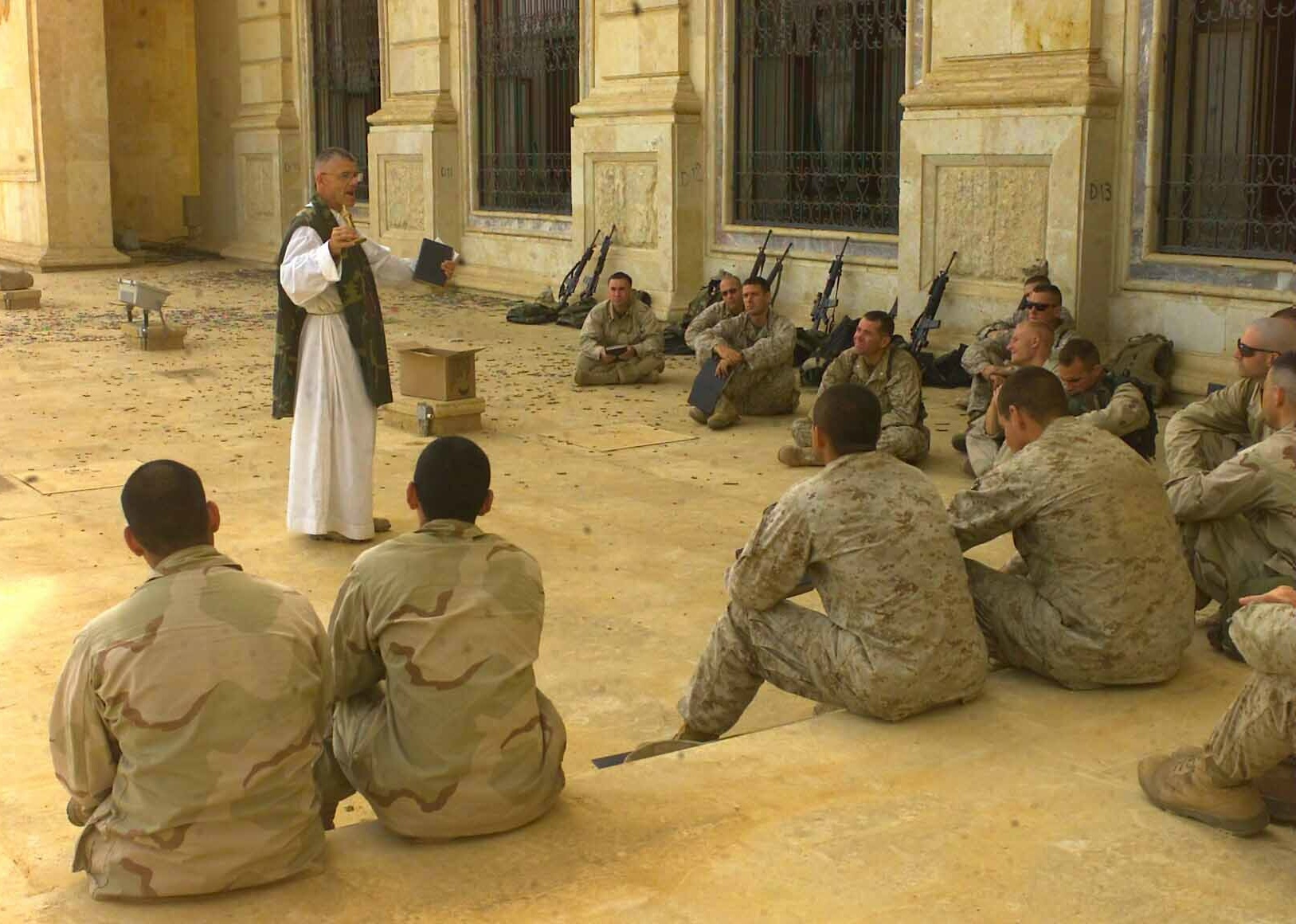
A Catholic chaplain offers Mass with American Marines and Sailors in Tikrit, Iraq.

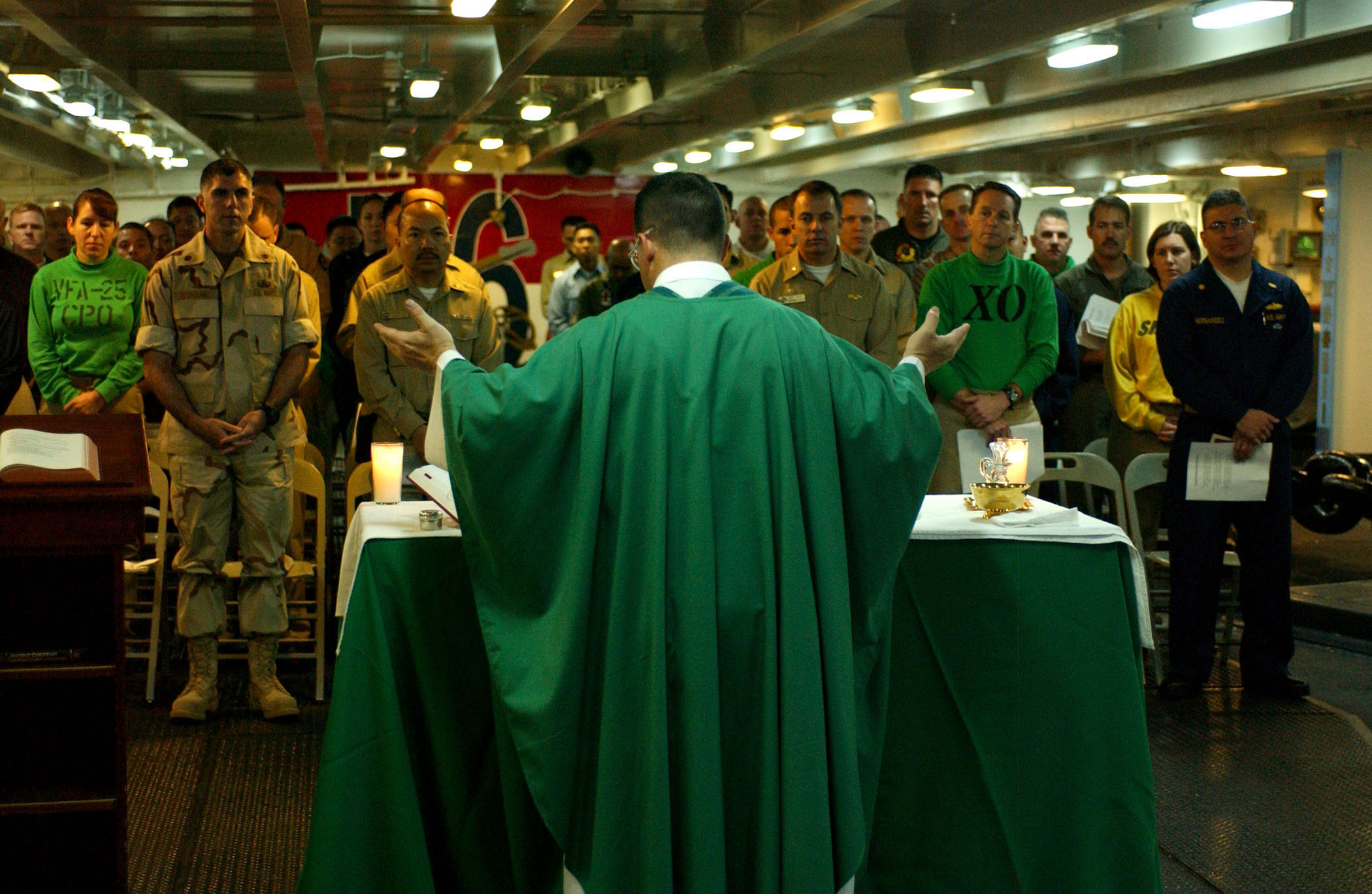
U.S. Navy Chaplain Father Kenneth Medve offers Catholic Mass on board the USS Ronald Reagan.

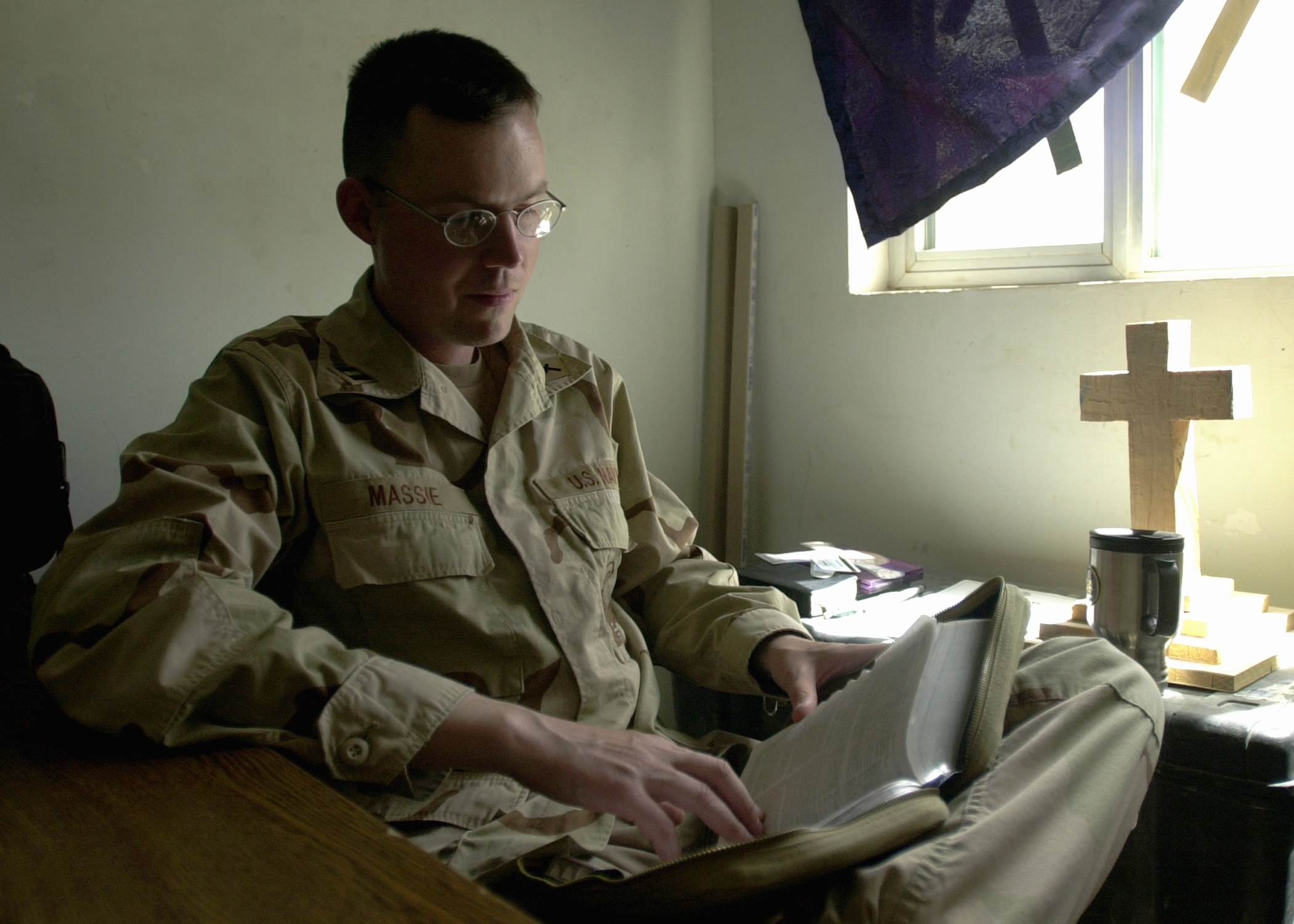
A U.S. Navy chaplain in Iraq studies his Bible for an upcoming service.

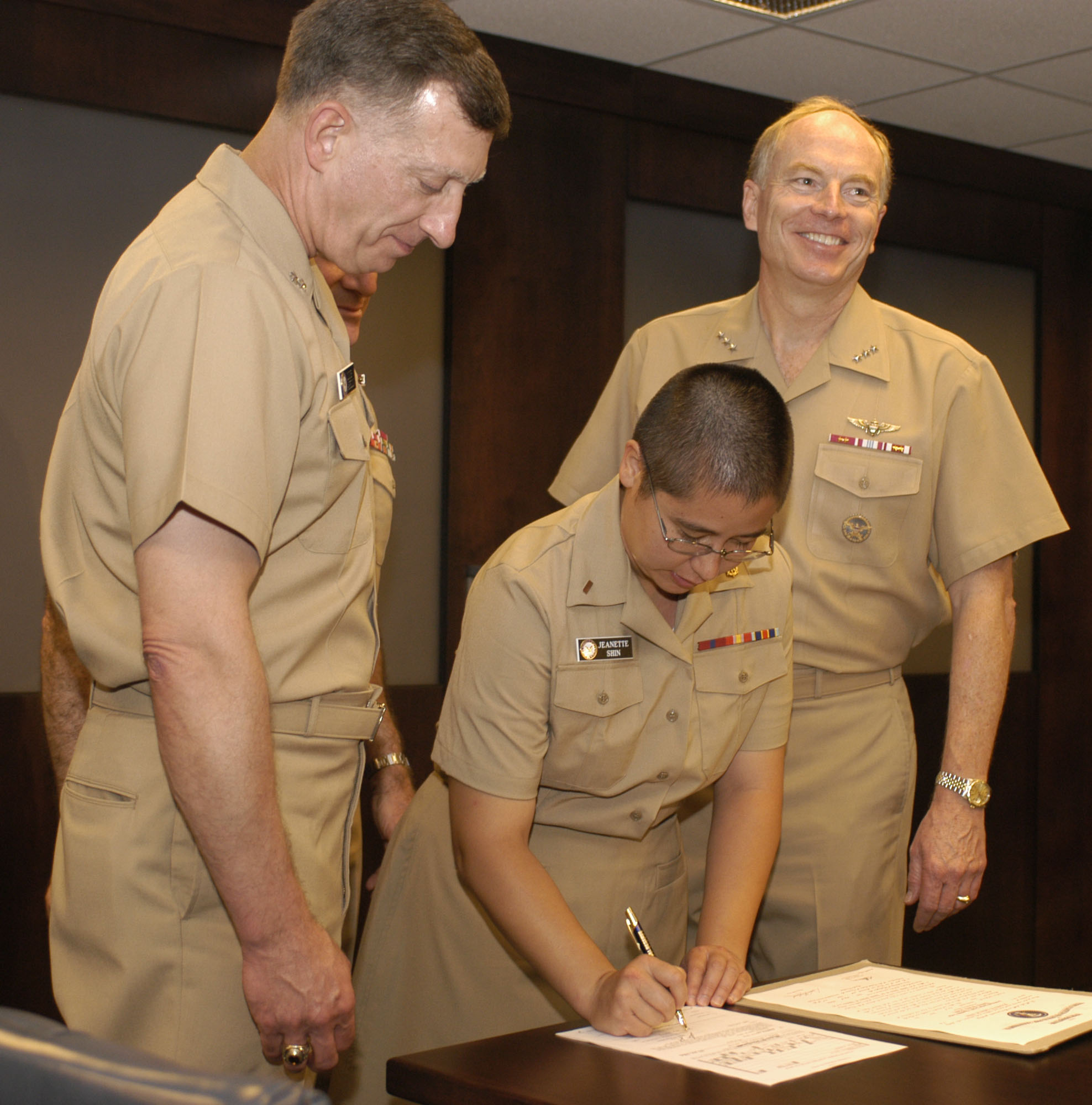
LTJG Shin signs her oath of office to become the first Buddhist chaplain in the US Military in 2004

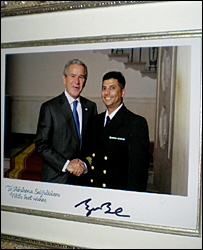
President George W. Bush congratulates Chaplain Imam Abuhena Saifulislam, the first US Navy Muslim chaplain assigned to the Marine Corps.

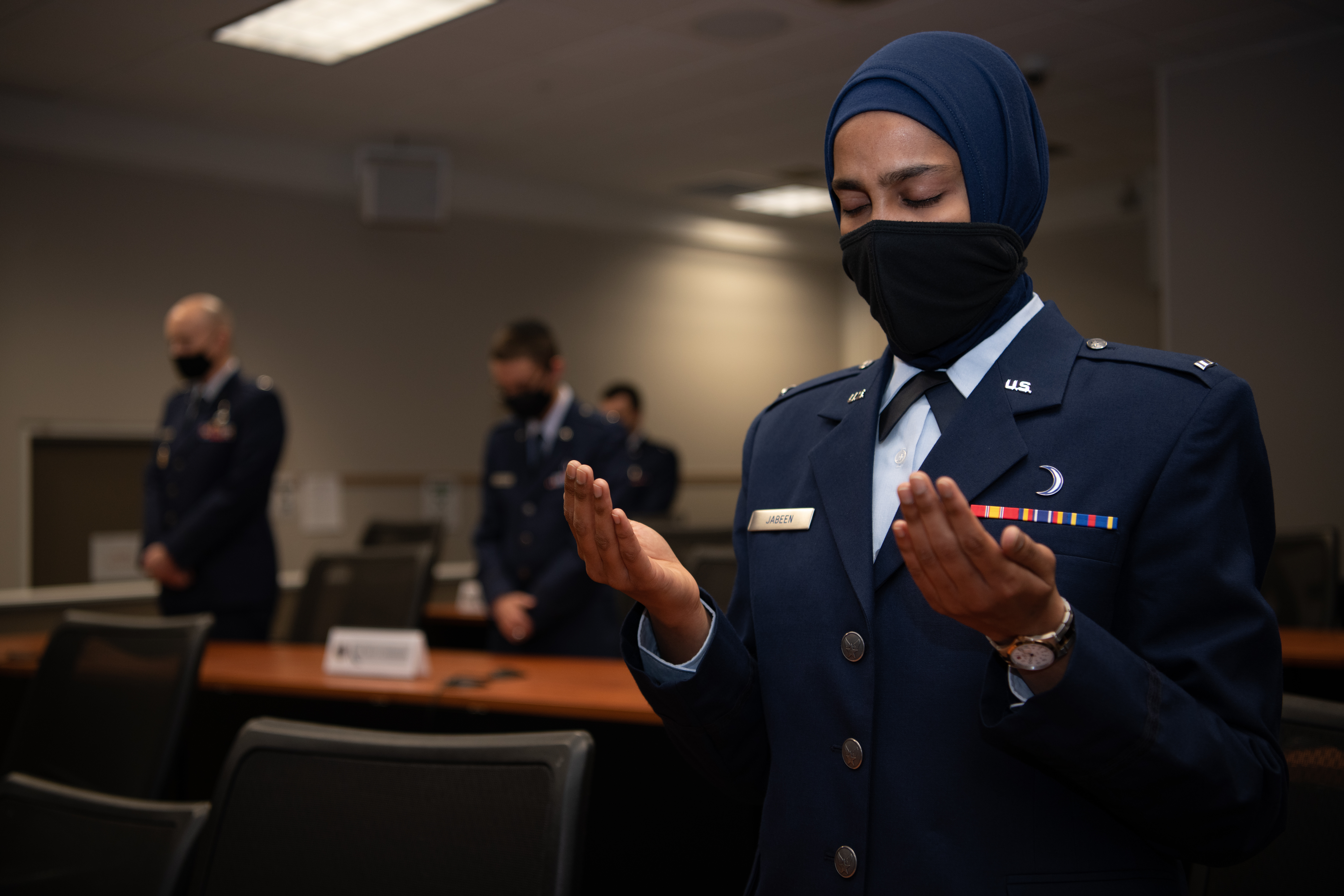
Saleha Jabeen, the first female Muslim military chaplain from the Air Force Chaplain Corps College

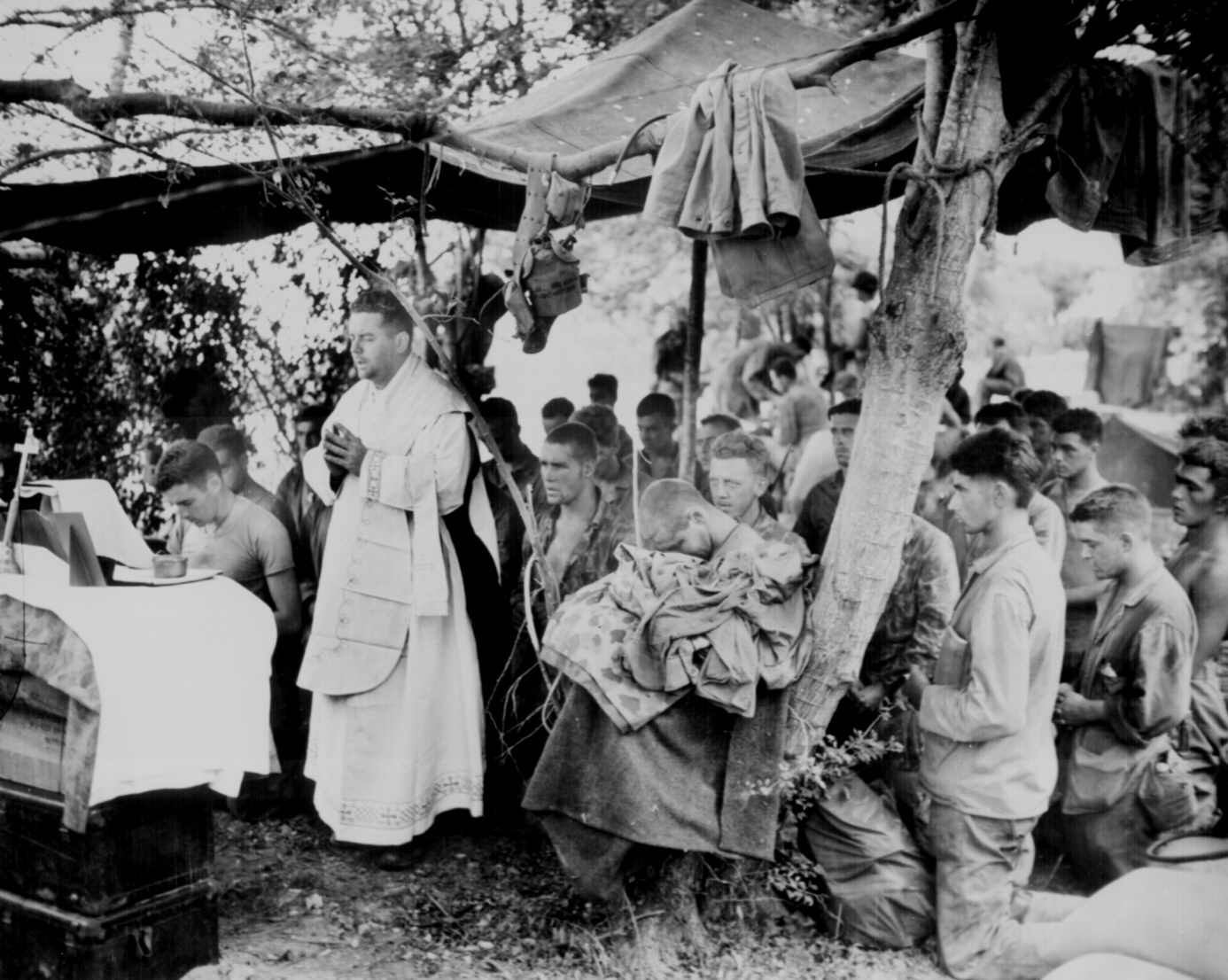
A U.S. Navy chaplain offers Catholic Mass for U.S. Marines at Saipan, June 1944.

== Military Chaplains Association ==
The Military Chaplains Association of the United States of America is dedicated to the religious freedom and spiritual welfare of our armed services members, veterans, their families, and their survivors. Founded in 1925, it received a congressional charter in 1950 by the 81st United States Congress.

== See also ==
- Chaplain Corps (United States Army)
- United States Air Force Chaplain Corps
- United States Navy Chaplain Corps
- Chaplain of the United States Coast Guard
- Chaplain of the United States Marine Corps
- Episcopal Diocese of the Armed Services and Federal Ministries
- Four Chaplains
- Insignia of chaplain schools in the United States military
- List of Chaplain Corps Medal of Honor recipients
- Military chaplain
- New Testament military metaphors
- Religious symbolism in the United States military
- Roman Catholic Archdiocese for the Military Services, USA
