= Robert H. Cox =

American medical researcher

- Born: Philadelphia, Pennsylvania
- Education: University of Pennsylvania (PhD); Drexel University, Philadelphia (MS and BS)
- Scientific career
- Fields: Cardiology, Physiology
- Workplaces: Lankenau Institute for Medical Research; Bockus Research Institute at the Graduate Hospital; University of Pennsylvania

Robert Cox is professor emeritus at the Lankenau Institute for Medical Research. He is also emeritus professor of physiology at the University of Pennsylvania School of Medicine. Cox earned his B.S. in electrical engineering and his M.S. in biomedical engineering, both from Drexel University, Philadelphia; he earned his PhD in biomedical engineering from the University of Pennsylvania. His research is focused on how ion channels regulate blood pressure and the electrical signals that drive heartbeat, specifically a type of calcium channel that is present only in arteries.

Books edited

- Recent Advances in Arterial Diseases: Atherosclerosis, Hypertension and Vasospasm, ed. Thomas N. Tulenko and Robert H. Cox (New York: Alan R. Liss, Inc.), 1986.
- Acute Myocardial Infarction: Emerging Concepts of Pathogenesis and Treatment, ed. Robert H. Cox (New York: Praeger), 1989
- Cellular and Molecular Mechanisms in Hypertension, ed. Robert H. Cox (New York: Plenum Press), 1989
