= Rixey =

Rixey may refer to:

== People ==
- Eppa Rixey (1891–1963), Major League Baseball pitcher
- George F. Rixey (1888–1974), first Deputy Chief of Chaplains of the United States Army
- John Franklin Rixey (1854–1907), American politician
- Presley Marion Rixey (1852–1928), US Navy Rear Admiral, Surgeon General of the United States Navy, and presidential physician

== Other uses ==
- USS Rixey (APH-3), a casualty evacuation transport ship in the US Navy
- Rixey, Virginia, United States
