= General Hurley =

General Hurley may refer to:

- David Hurley (born 1953), Australian Army general
- Patrick J. Hurley (1883–1963), U.S. Army major general
- Paul K. Hurley (born 1961), U.S. Army major general
