= Jerome A. Haberek =

United States Army general

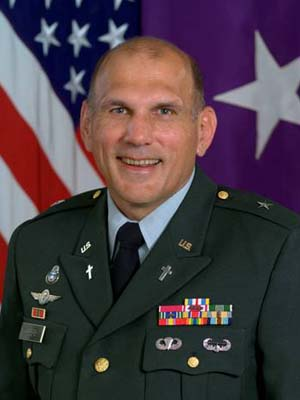
- Brigadier General Jerome A. Haberek; 21st Deputy Chief of Chaplains of the United States Army
- Born: December 20, 1951 (age 74)
- Military career
- Allegiance: United States of America
- Branch: United States Army
- Service years: 1973–2005
- Rank: Brigadier General
- Conflicts: War on terror
- Awards: Def. Superior Service Medal; Legion of Merit; Meritorious Service Medal

Chaplain (Brigadier General) Jerome A. Haberek, USA (born December 20, 1951) is a retired American Army officer who served as the 21st Deputy Chief of Chaplains of the United States Army from 2003 to 2005.

== Awards and decorations ==
Defense Superior Service Medal
Legion of Merit
Meritorious Service Medal
Army Commendation Medal
Army Achievement Medal (with one bronze oak leaf cluster)
Army Reserve Components Achievement Medal
Armed Forces Reserve Medal
Army Superior Unit Award
National Defense Service Medal
Army Service Ribbon
Overseas Service Ribbon

Military offices
Preceded by David H. Hicks	Deputy Chief of Chaplains of the United States Army; 2003–2005	Succeeded by Douglas L. Carver
