= Charles R. Bailey =

United States Army general

Charles Ray Bailey
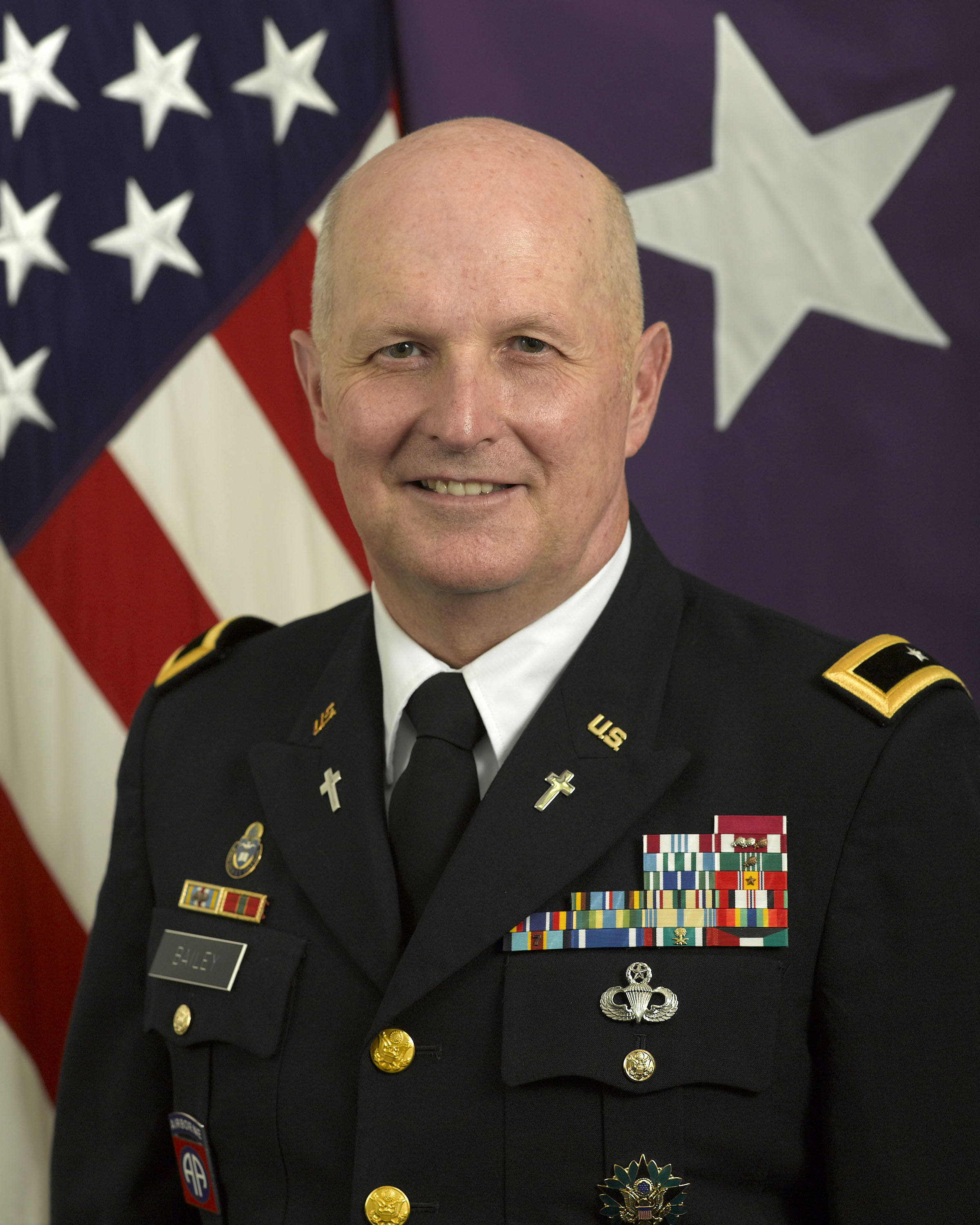
- Chaplain (Brigadier General) Charles Ray Bailey; 24th Deputy Chief of Chaplains of the United States Army
- Born: Odessa, Texas, U.S.
- Military career
- Allegiance: United States
- Branch: United States Army
- Service years: 1977–2015
- Rank: Brigadier General
- Conflicts: Gulf War; War on terror; War in Afghanistan
- Awards: Legion of Merit; Def. Meritorious Service Medal; Meritorious Service Medal (12)

Chaplain (Brigadier General) Charles Ray Bailey is a former U.S. Army officer who was the 24th Deputy Chief of Chaplains of the United States Army from 2011 to 2015.

From 2007 to 2011, Chaplain Bailey served as the United States Army Europe Command Chaplain.

In May 2011, United States Secretary of Defense Robert Gates announced that Colonel Bailey had been nominated for promotion to brigadier general and reassignment as the Deputy Chief of Chaplains.

== Education ==
Bailey earned a bachelor's degree in Business and Religion from Texas Wesleyan University in 1975. He then received a master's degree in Divinity from the Brite Divinity School at Texas Christian University in 1978. He later earned a master's degree in Strategic Studies from the United States Army War College in 2007.

== Awards and decorations ==
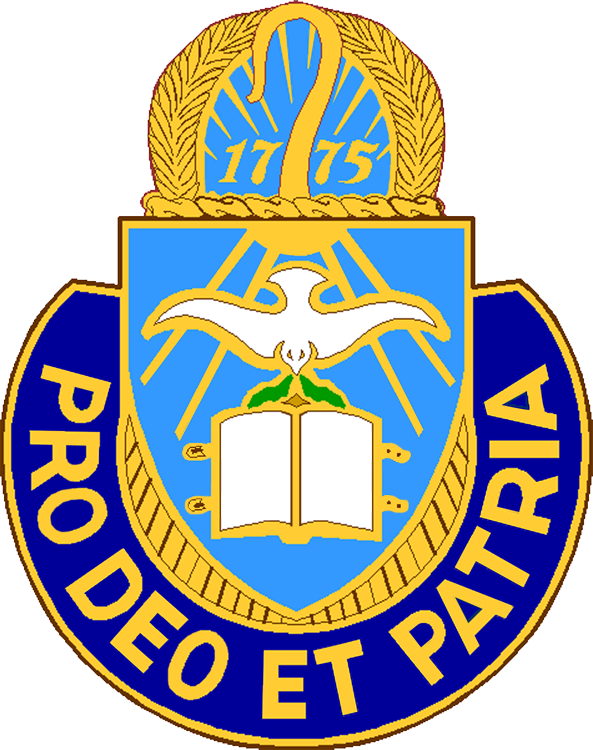
Master Parachutist Badge
Army Staff Identification Badge
82nd Airborne Division Combat Service Identification Badge
U.S. Army Chaplain Corps Distinctive Unit Insignia

Legion of Merit
Defense Meritorious Service Medal
Meritorious Service Medal (with two silver and one bronze oak leaf clusters)
Joint Service Commendation Medal
Army Commendation Medal (with one bronze oak leaf cluster)
Army Achievement Medal
Joint Meritorious Unit Award (with two bronze oak leaf clusters)
Army Superior Unit Award
National Defense Service Medal (with one bronze service star)
Armed Forces Expeditionary Medal
Southwest Asia Service Medal
Afghanistan Campaign Medal
Global War on Terrorism Service Medal
Armed Forces Service Medal
Armed Forces Reserve Medal
Army Service Ribbon
Overseas Service Ribbon (with award numeral 7)
NATO Medal for Yugoslavia Service
Kuwait Liberation Medal (Saudi Arabia)
Kuwait Liberation Medal (Kuwait)

Military offices
Preceded by Donald L. Rutherford	Deputy Chief of Chaplains of the United States Army; 2011–2014	Succeeded by Thomas L. Solhjem
