= Thomas L. Solhjem =

American soldier and protestant minister, US Army Chief of Chaplains

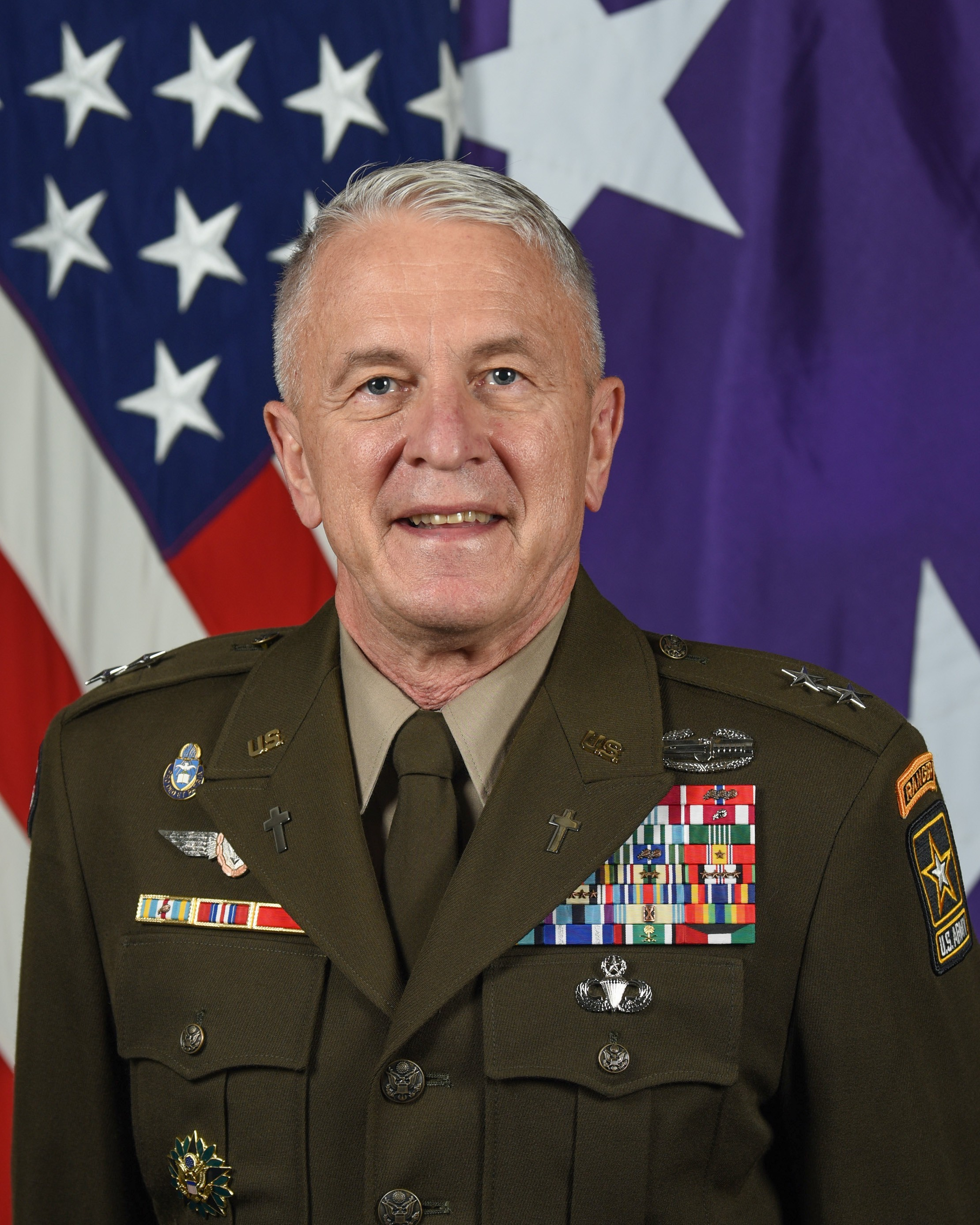
- Official portrait of CH (MG) Solhjem, 2022
- Born: Thomas Lynn Solhjem; October 1956 (age 70)
- Alma mater: North Central University (BA); Bethel Seminary (MDiv); U.S. Army War College (MSS)
- Spouse: Divorced
- Children: Natalie L. Solhjem
- Military career
- Allegiance: United States
- Branch: United States Army; Army Reserve (1976‍–‍1988)
- Service years: Currently Serving.
- Rank: Major general
- Commands: U.S. Army Chaplain Corps (CCH)
- Conflicts: Gulf War; War on terror; War in Afghanistan; Iraq War
- Awards: Legion of Merit (2); Bronze Star Medal (4)

Thomas Lynn Solhjem (born 1956) is a United States Army major general who serves as the 25th Chief of Chaplains of the United States Army. Solhjem is the first ordained Assemblies of God minister to attain the position.

== Education ==
Solhjem received a Bachelors of Arts in Pastoral Counseling and Specialized Ministries from North Central University in 1982. He completed a Masters of Divinity with Bethel Theological Seminary in 1988, and holds a second master's degree in Military Strategic Studies.

== Military career ==
Solhjem began his military career in 1974 with the 82nd Combat Engineer Battalion. After serving on active duty for two years, he transferred to the Army Reserve, where he remained for twelve years. After finishing his Masters of Divinity, he accessioned as an active duty chaplain in 1988.

Solhjem has given direct religious support to soldiers, totaling more than 68 months in combat zones. Prior to his appointment as the Deputy Chief of Chaplains, he served in various key leadership positions to include United States Army Forces Command (FORSCOM), Command Chaplain, Fort Bragg, North Carolina, as well as Command Chaplain, United States Special Operations Command, AFB, Florida.

In July 2015, Solhjem was promoted to brigadier general and assigned as the 25th Deputy Chief of Chaplains of the United States Army. In May 2019, Colonel William Green Jr., an African American Baptist minister, was nominated to succeed him as Deputy Chief of Chaplains. On May 31, 2019, Solhjem was promoted to major general and assigned as the 25th Chief of Chaplains of the United States Army.

As the Deputy Chief of Chaplains, Solhjem served as the chief strategist for the United States Army Chaplain Corps and senior coordinating general officer for actions assigned to Assistant Chiefs of Chaplains (Reserve Component) and the USACHCS Chief of Chaplains of the United States Army. As a member of the Armed Forces Chaplains Board, he and other members advise the Secretary of Defense and Joint Chiefs of Staff on religious, ethical and quality-of-life concerns.

== Awards and decorations ==
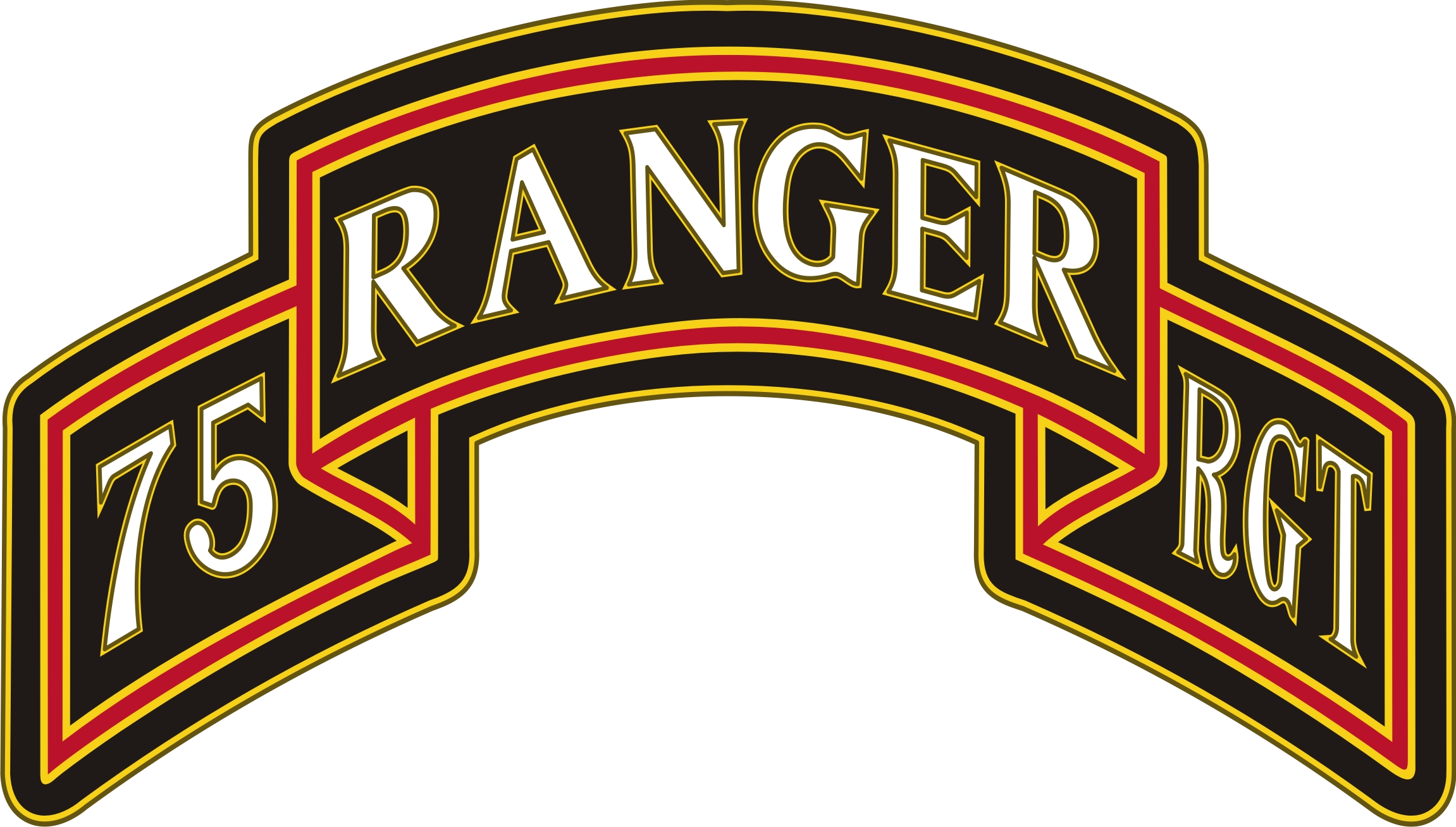
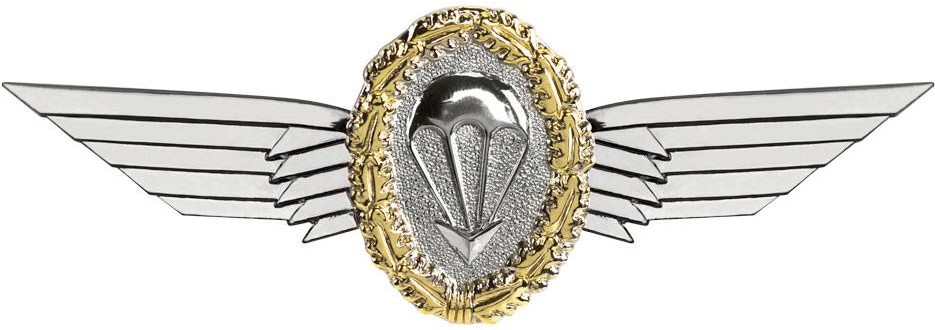
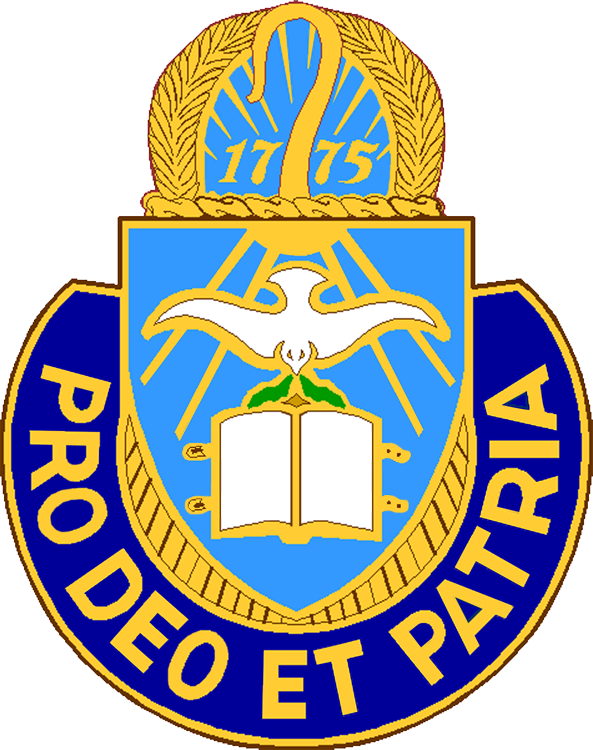
Combat Action Badge
Master Parachutist Badge
Ranger Tab
Army Staff Identification Badge
75th Ranger Regiment Combat Service Identification Badge
Silver German Parachutist Badge
U.S. Army Chaplain Corps Distinctive Unit Insignia
10 Overseas Service Bars

Legion of Merit with one bronze oak leaf cluster
Bronze Star Medal with three oak leaf clusters
Defense Meritorious Service Medal
Meritorious Service Medal with silver oak leaf cluster
Joint Service Commendation Medal
Army Commendation Medal
Joint Service Achievement Medal
Army Achievement Medal with two oak leaf clusters
Joint Meritorious Unit Award with oak leaf cluster
Valorous Unit Award
Meritorious Unit Commendation
National Defense Service Medal with one bronze service star
Armed Forces Expeditionary Medal with service star
Southwest Asia Service Medal with two service stars
Afghanistan Campaign Medal with four service stars
Iraq Campaign Medal with four service stars
Global War on Terrorism Expeditionary Medal
Global War on Terrorism Service Medal
Korea Defense Service Medal
Humanitarian Service Medal
Armed Forces Reserve Medal with bronze Hourglass device
Army Service Ribbon
Army Overseas Service Ribbon with bronze award numeral 5
NATO Medal for service with ISAF
Kuwait Liberation Medal (Saudi Arabia)
Kuwait Liberation Medal (Kuwait)

Military offices
Preceded by Charles R. Bailey	Deputy Chief of Chaplains of the United States Army; 2015–2019	Succeeded by William Green Jr.
Preceded by Paul K. Hurley	Chief of Chaplains of the United States Army; 2019–2026	Succeeded by William Green Jr.
