= David Hicks (chaplain) =

United States Army general (born 1941)

The Reverend David H. Hicks
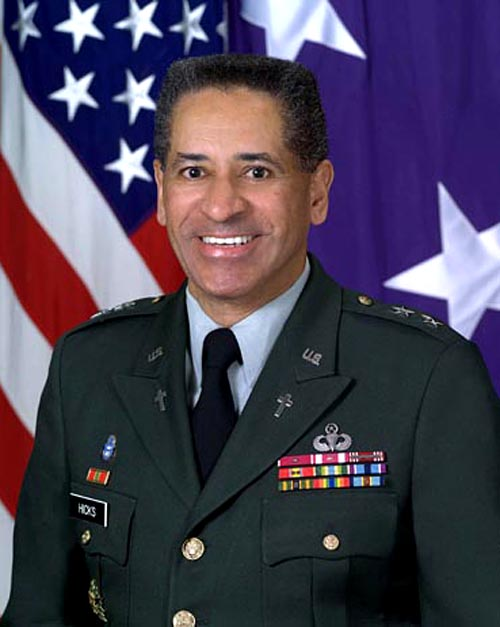
- Official portrait of Chaplain (MG) Hicks, 2003
- Born: David Harlan Hicks; 1941 (age 84–85)
- Education: Penn Wesleyan College (BS); Princeton Theological Seminary (MDiv); Duke Divinity School (ThM)
- Military career
- Branch: United States Army
- Service years: 1958–1967; 1974–2007
- Rank: Major general
- Commands: U.S. Army Chaplain Corps (CCH)
- Conflicts: War on terror
- Awards: Distinguished Service Medal; Legion of Merit; Meritorious Service Medal
- Church: Presbyterian Church (USA)

Orders
- Ordination: 4 August 1974 by Lehigh Presbytery

David Harlan Hicks (born 1942) is a retired American army officer who served as the 21st Chief of Chaplains of the United States Army from 2003 to 2007. Hicks began his career in 1958 and was stationed as a patrolman in the Korean Demilitarized Zone in 1965. On 4 August 1974, he was ordained as a minister in the United Presbyterian Church in the United States of America, which merged with the Presbyterian Church in the United States in 1983 to form the Presbyterian Church (USA). He served as a command chaplain at the United States Army Special Forces Command (USASOC) at Fort Bragg, North Carolina. He has over 30 years of experience as an army chaplain. As the Army's Chief of Chaplains, he oversaw over 2,200 chaplains serving in United States Army, National Guard, and Army Reserve capacities.

He retired in 2007, and was succeeded by Brig. Gen. Douglas L. Carver.

== Awards and decorations ==
- Distinguished Service Medal
- Legion of Merit (with two bronze oak leaf clusters)
- Meritorious Service Medal (with one silver oak leaf cluster)
- Army Superior Unit Award
- Army Good Conduct Medal (2 awards)
- National Defense Service Medal (with two bronze service stars)
- Armed Forces Service Medal
- Humanitarian Service Medal
- NCO Professional Development Ribbon (with bronze award numeral 2)
- Army Service Ribbon
- Overseas Service Ribbon (with award numeral 5)

== Gallery ==
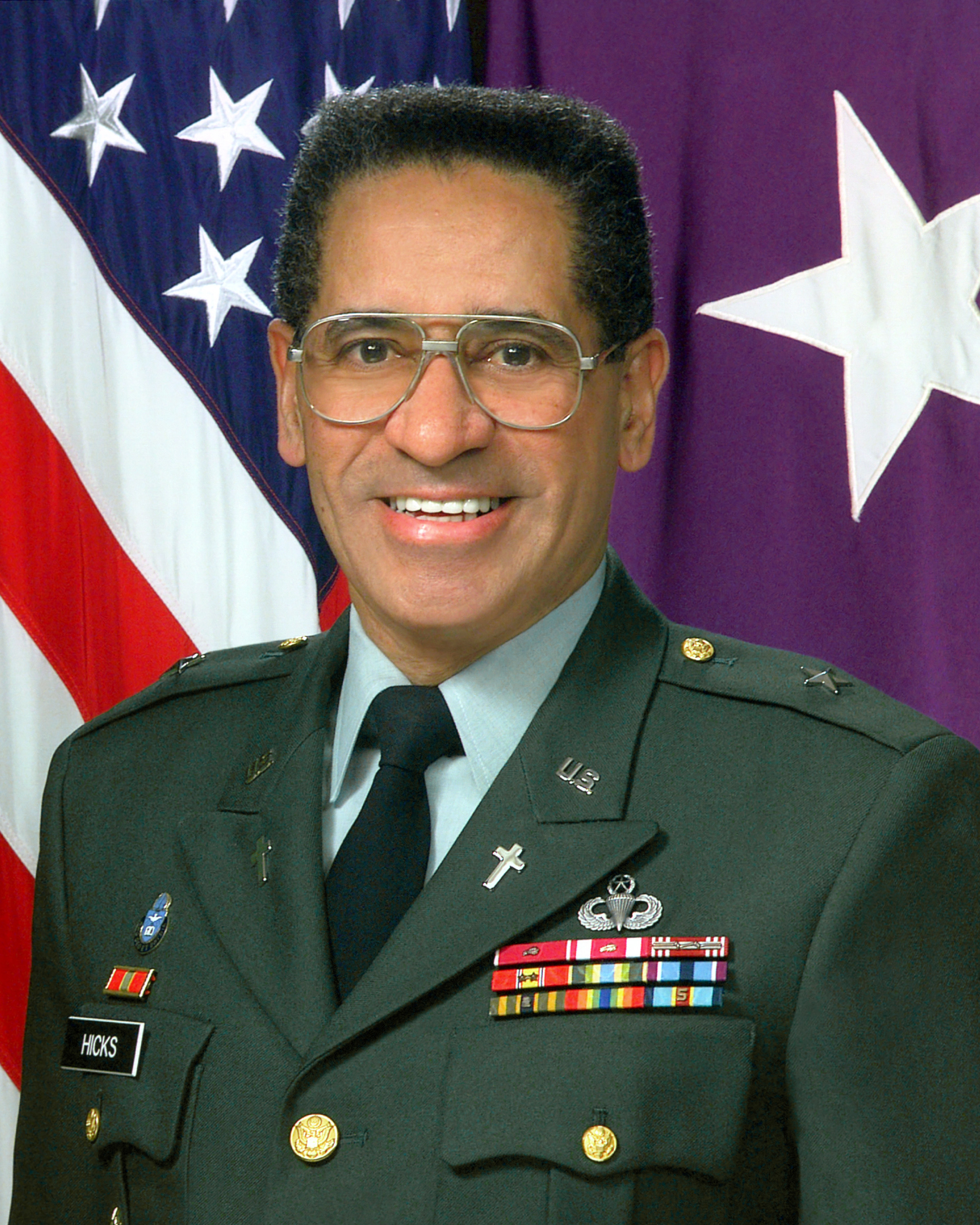

Military offices
Preceded by Gaylord T. Gunhus	Deputy Chief of Chaplains of the United States Army; 1999–2003	Succeeded by Jerome A. Haberek
Preceded by Gaylord T. Gunhus	Chief of Chaplains of the United States Army; 2003–2007	Succeeded by Douglas L. Carver
