= William Green Jr. (chaplain) =

American soldier and minister, US Army Chief of Chaplains

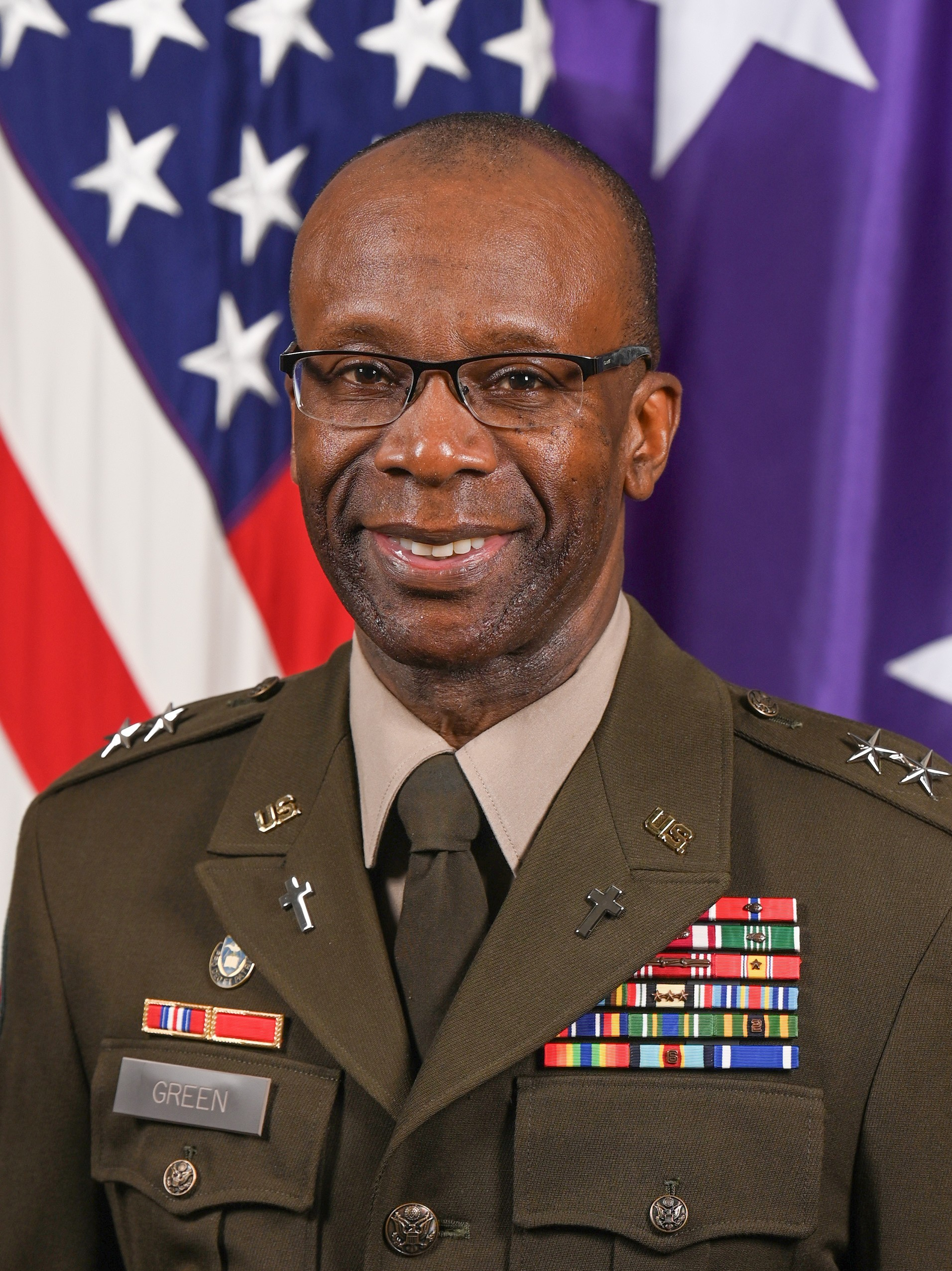
- Official portrait of Green
- Education: Savannah State University; Emory University
- Military career
- Allegiance: United States
- Branch: United States Army
- Rank: Major general
- Commands: Command chaplain, Fort Shafter; Chief of Chaplains of the United States Army
- Conflicts: Iraq War
- Awards: Legion of Merit; Bronze Star; Meritorious Service Medal; Army Commendation Medal

William Green Jr. is a United States Army major general who served as the 26th Chief of Chaplains of the United States Army. He was the third African-American to hold the position. He was asked to resign on 2 April 2026 by United States Secretary of Defense Pete Hegseth.

== Biography ==
Born in Savannah, Georgia, to William Green Sr. and Mary Green, Green grew up in Hilton Head Island, South Carolina. He has a brother, Calvin, who is a retired colonel; and three sisters, Rosalind, Samantha, and Brenda. After graduating from high school, Green enlisted in the army as a cannon crewman and radio repairman. Green married his wife Robin in 1984; they have three adult children. A member of the National Baptist Convention, Green left active duty in 1986 to become an ordained minister. He originally served as the pastor of Fairlawn Baptist Church in Garden City, Georgia. In 1989 he received a BS in Criminal Justice from Savannah State University and in 1992 he received a Master of Divinity degree from Emory University. He became an army chaplain in 1994.

Green has served as I Corps Command Chaplain at Joint Base Lewis McChord; Division Chaplain for the 1st Armored Division in Germany and deployed as part of Operation Iraqi Freedom; chaplain of the 28th Combat Support Hospital at Fort Bragg, during which he deployed as part of Operation Joint Forge; chaplain for the 1st Battalion, 37th Field Artillery, Fort Lewis, Washington; chaplain for the 702nd Main Support Battalion, 2nd Infantry Division, Camp Casey, Korea; and as chaplain for the 14th Field Artillery, Fort Sill, Oklahoma.

From October 2016 to July 2019, Green was the command chaplain at Fort Shafter for the United States Army Pacific.

Green was named deputy chief of chaplains and promoted to brigadier general in August 2019. In December 2023, he was promoted to major general. He was formally promoted in a ceremony in March 2024.

Green was one of the three senior Army officers fired by Secretary of Defense Pete Hegseth on 2 April 2026, along with Chief of Staff of the United States Army General Randy George and General David M. Hodne, commander of the Army’s Transformation and Training Command.

Military offices
Preceded by Thomas L. Solhjem	Deputy Chief of Chaplains of the United States Army; 2019–2023	Succeeded by Jack Stumme
Preceded by Thomas L. Solhjem	Chief of Chaplains of the United States Army; 2023–2026	Succeeded by -
