= Thaddeus F. Malanowski =

American priest (1922–2020)

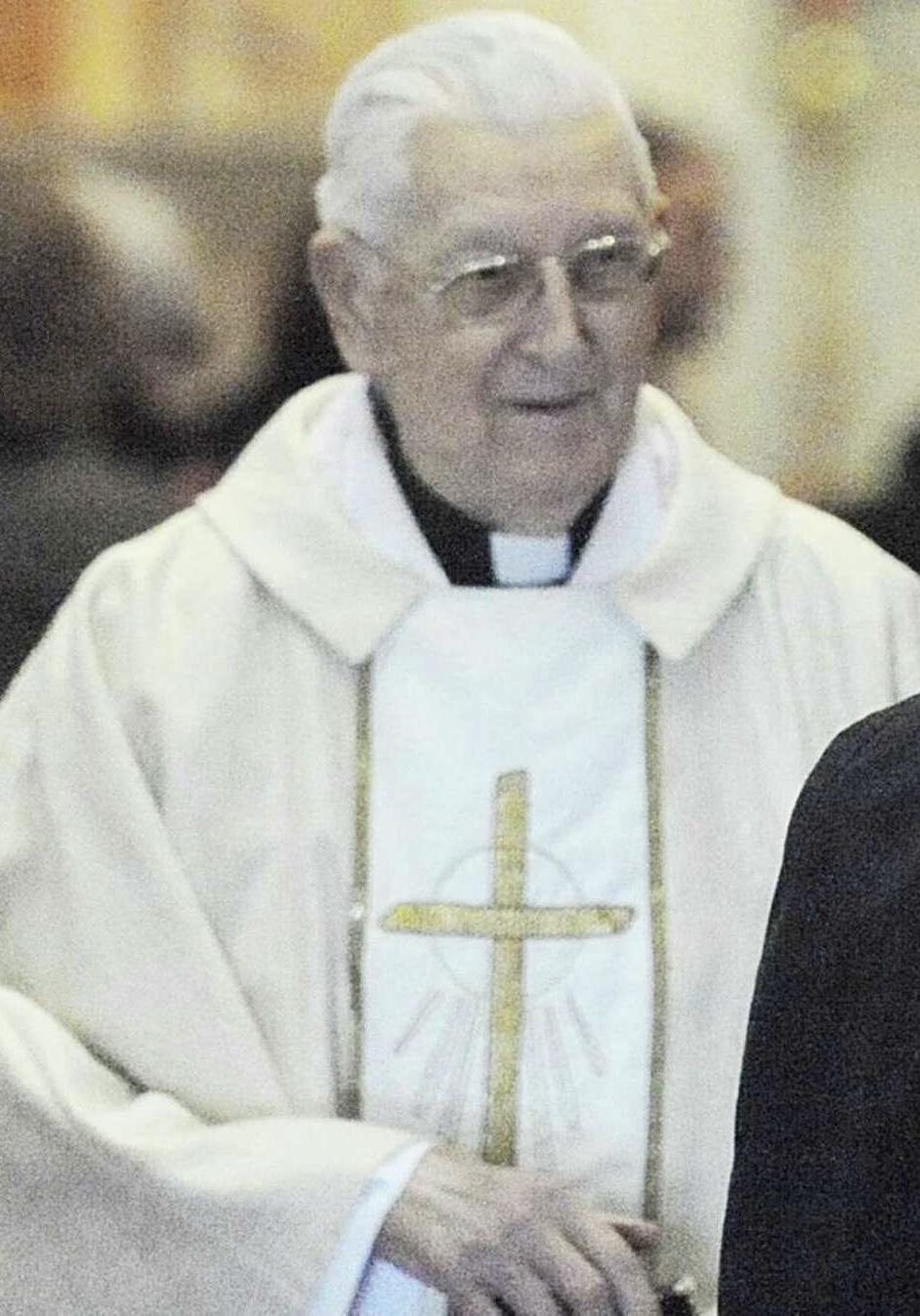
- Born: November 30, 1922; Stamford, Connecticut, U.S.
- Died: January 23, 2020 (aged 97); Stamford, Connecticut, U.S.
- Military career
- Allegiance: United States
- Branch: United States Army
- Rank: Brigadier general
- Commands: Deputy Chief of Chaplains of the United States Army

Thaddeus F. Malanowski (November 30, 1922 – January 23, 2020) was an American Catholic priest who served as the Deputy Chief of Chaplains of the United States Army. He was the first Polish-American to be in this position.

A native of Stamford, Connecticut, Malanowski was an ordained Roman Catholic priest for the Diocese of Norwich and served at his home parish of Holy Name of Jesus in Stamford, CT following his retirement from active ministry. In 1973, he was given the title of Monsignor by Pope Paul VI. He was a close friend of Elvis Presley.

== Career ==
Malanowski was commissioned an officer in the United States Army in 1949. From 1951 to 1954, he served with NATO as a member of the 43rd Infantry Division. Other assignments he was given include serving at Headquarters, United States Army Europe before he was named Deputy Chief of Chaplains with the rank of Brigadier General. He held this position until his retirement in 1978.

Awards he has received include the Legion of Merit, the Army Distinguished Service Medal, the Meritorious Service Medal and the Army Commendation Medal with two oak leaf clusters.

Malanowski also served on the Haitian Health Foundation Board of Directors from 1985 until his death in January 2020 at the age of 97.
