= Douglas L. Carver =

United States Army general

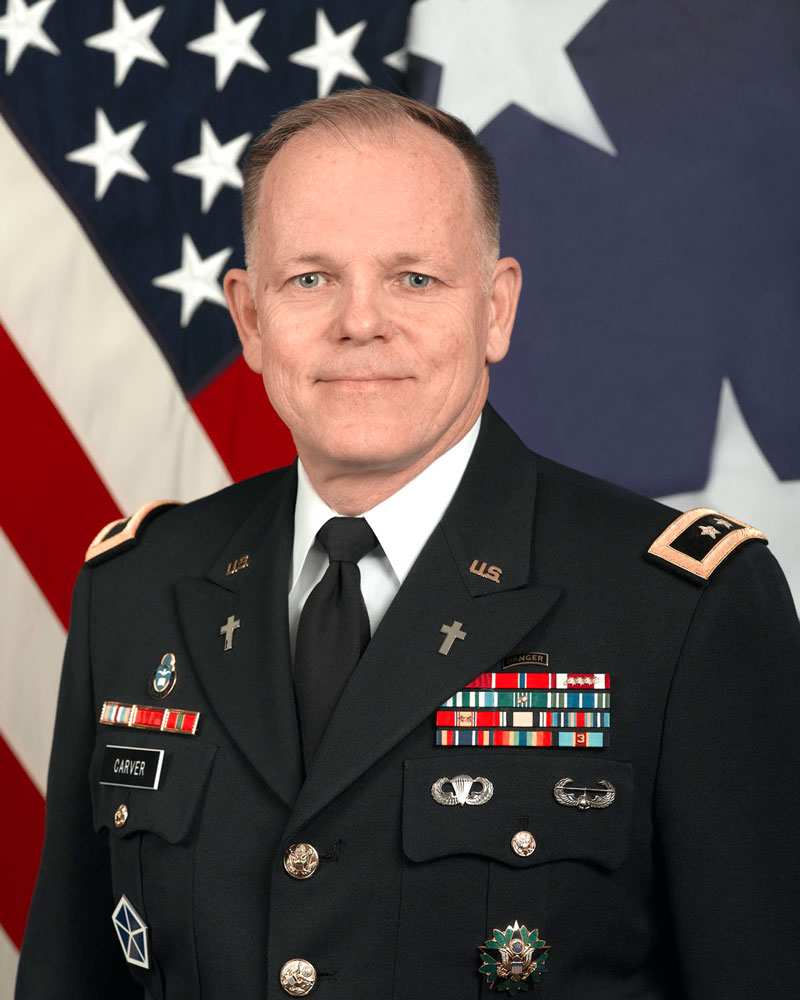
- Official portrait of Chaplain (MG) Carver, 2009
- Born: Douglas Lanier Carver; 10 September 1951 (age 75); Rome, Georgia, U.S.
- Education: University of Tennessee (BA); Southern Baptist Theological Seminary (MDiv); U.S. Army War College (MA)
- Spouse: Susan Gray (m. 1973)
- Children: 2
- Military career
- Allegiance: United States
- Branch: United States Army; Army Reserve (1979‍–‍1984)
- Service years: 1973–2011
- Rank: Major general
- Commands: U.S. Army Chaplain Corps (CCH)
- Conflicts: War on terror; Iraq War
- Awards: Distinguished Service Medal; Legion of Merit (2); Bronze Star Medal
- Church: Southern Baptist Convention

Douglas Lanier Carver (born 10 September 1951) is a retired American Army officer who served as the 22nd Chief of Chaplains of the United States Army. He was appointed to this assignment on 12 July 2007, and was the first Southern Baptist chaplain to be promoted to the position of Chief of Chaplains in more than 50 years.

== Career ==
Carver holds theology degrees from the University of Tennessee and the Southern Baptist Theological Seminary.

He was originally commissioned in the field artillery and served with the 4th Infantry Division as a company grade officer in various artillery positions. He left active duty, but served with the Army Reserve for five additional years.

Upon returning to active duty in 1984, he attended the Chaplain Corps officer basic course and began his career in the chaplaincy. Before serving as Deputy Chief of Chaplains in September 2005, he was director of training at the Chaplain Center and School at Fort Jackson, South Carolina. He was also a senior chaplain for V Corps and Combined Joint Task Force 7 in Germany and Iraq from 2002 through 2004. In his current position as Director of Chaplaincy with the North American Mission Board (the endorsing agent for the Southern Baptist Convention), he is responsible for overseeing 2,700 chaplains around the world.

== Awards and decorations ==
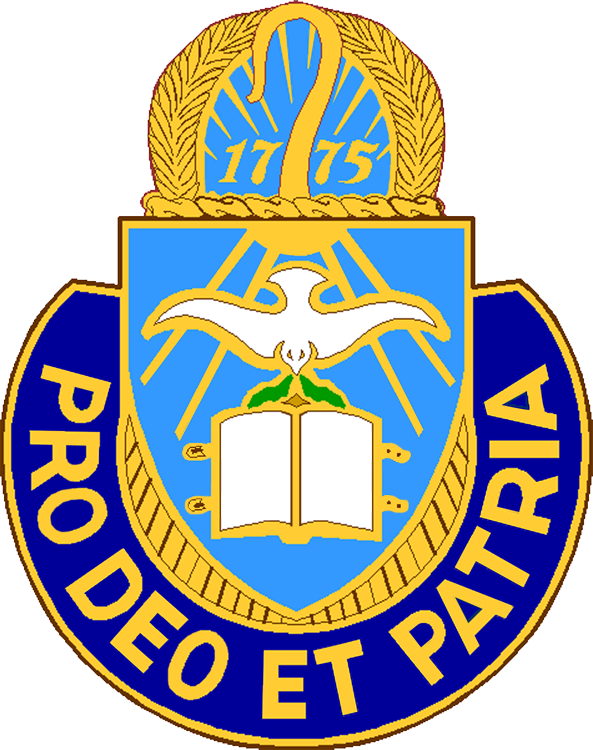
Ranger Tab
Basic Parachutist Badge
Air Assault Badge
Army Staff Identification Badge
U.S. Army Chaplain Corps Distinctive Unit Insignia
V Corps Combat Service Identification Badge
2 Overseas Service Bars

Army Distinguished Service Medal
Legion of Merit (with one bronze oak leaf cluster)
Bronze Star
Meritorious Service Medal (with four bronze oak leaf clusters)
Joint Service Commendation Medal
Army Commendation Medal (with one bronze oak leaf cluster)
Army Achievement Medal
Joint Meritorious Unit Award
Meritorious Unit Commendation
Army Superior Unit Award
National Defense Service Medal (with two bronze service stars)
Iraq Campaign Medal
Global War on Terrorism Expeditionary Medal
Global War on Terrorism Service Medal
Army Service Ribbon
Overseas Service Ribbon (with award numeral 3)

== Gallery ==
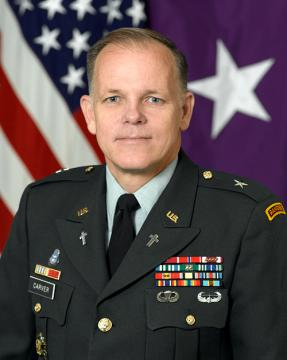

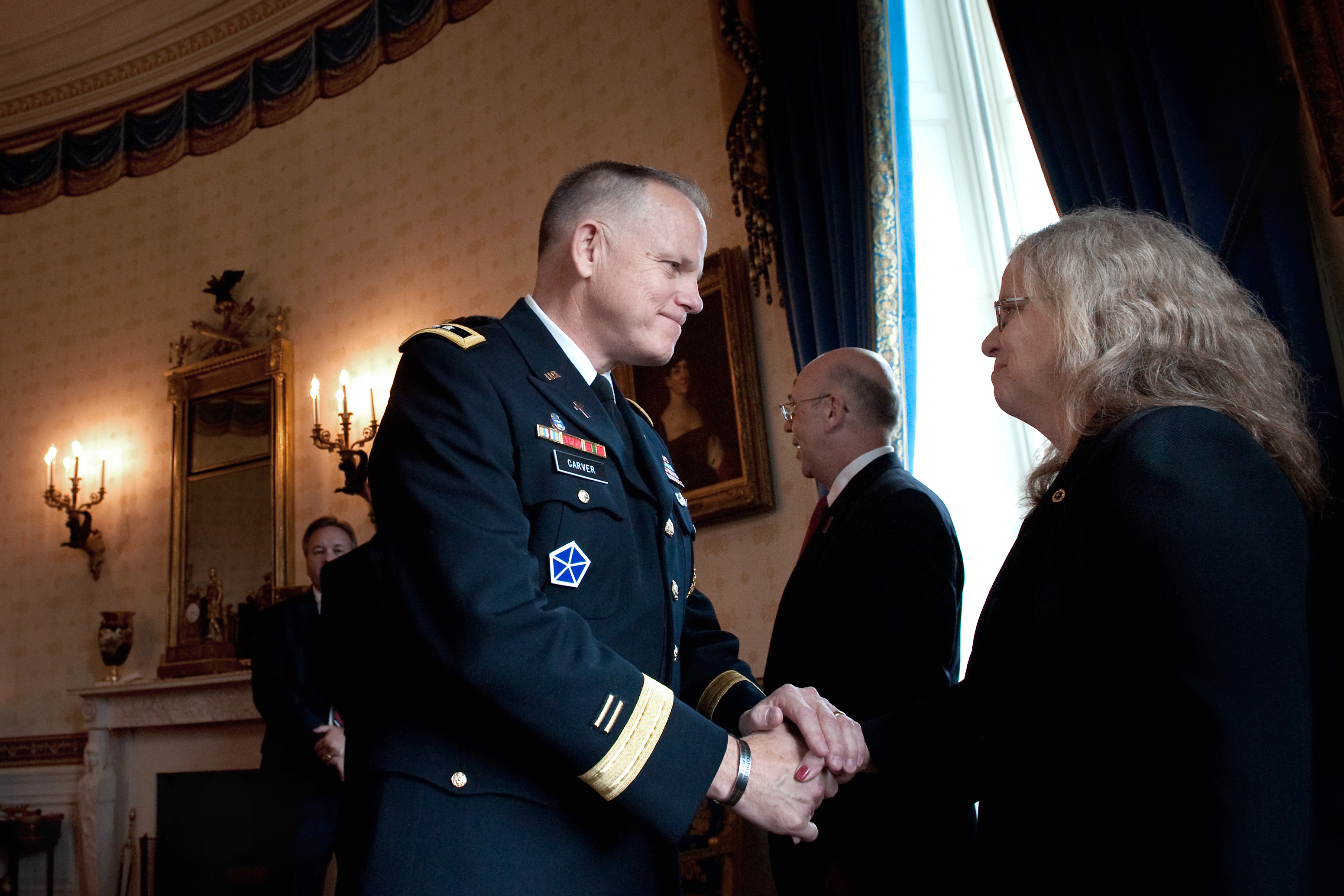

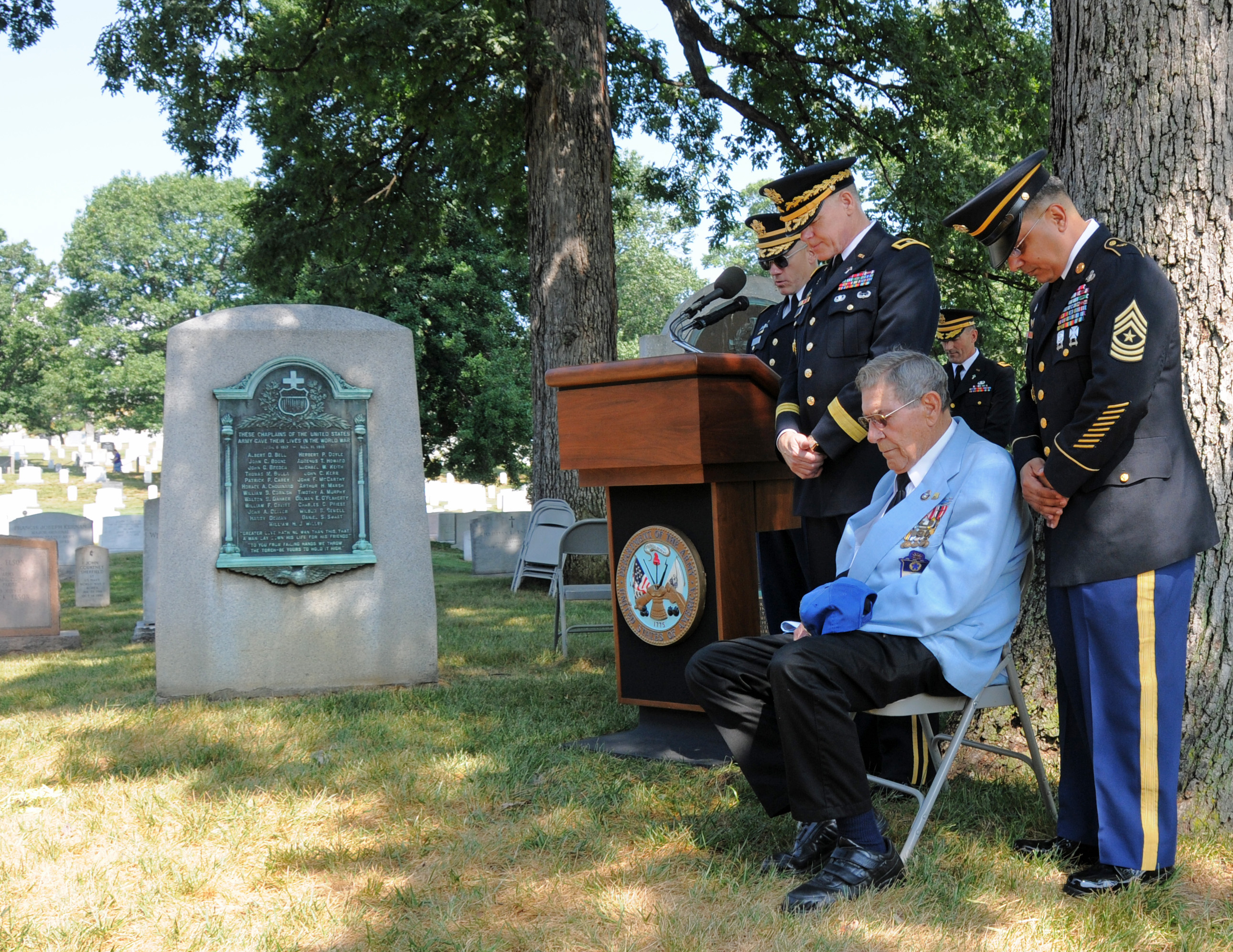

== See also ==
- Armed Forces Chaplains Board
- Chiefs of Chaplains of the United States

Military offices
Preceded by Jerome A. Haberek	Deputy Chief of Chaplains of the United States Army; 2005–2007	Succeeded by Donald L. Rutherford
Preceded by David Hicks	Chief of Chaplains of the United States Army; 2007–2011	Succeeded by Donald L. Rutherford
