= Donald L. Rutherford =

United States Army general (born 1955)

The Very Reverend Donald L. Rutherford
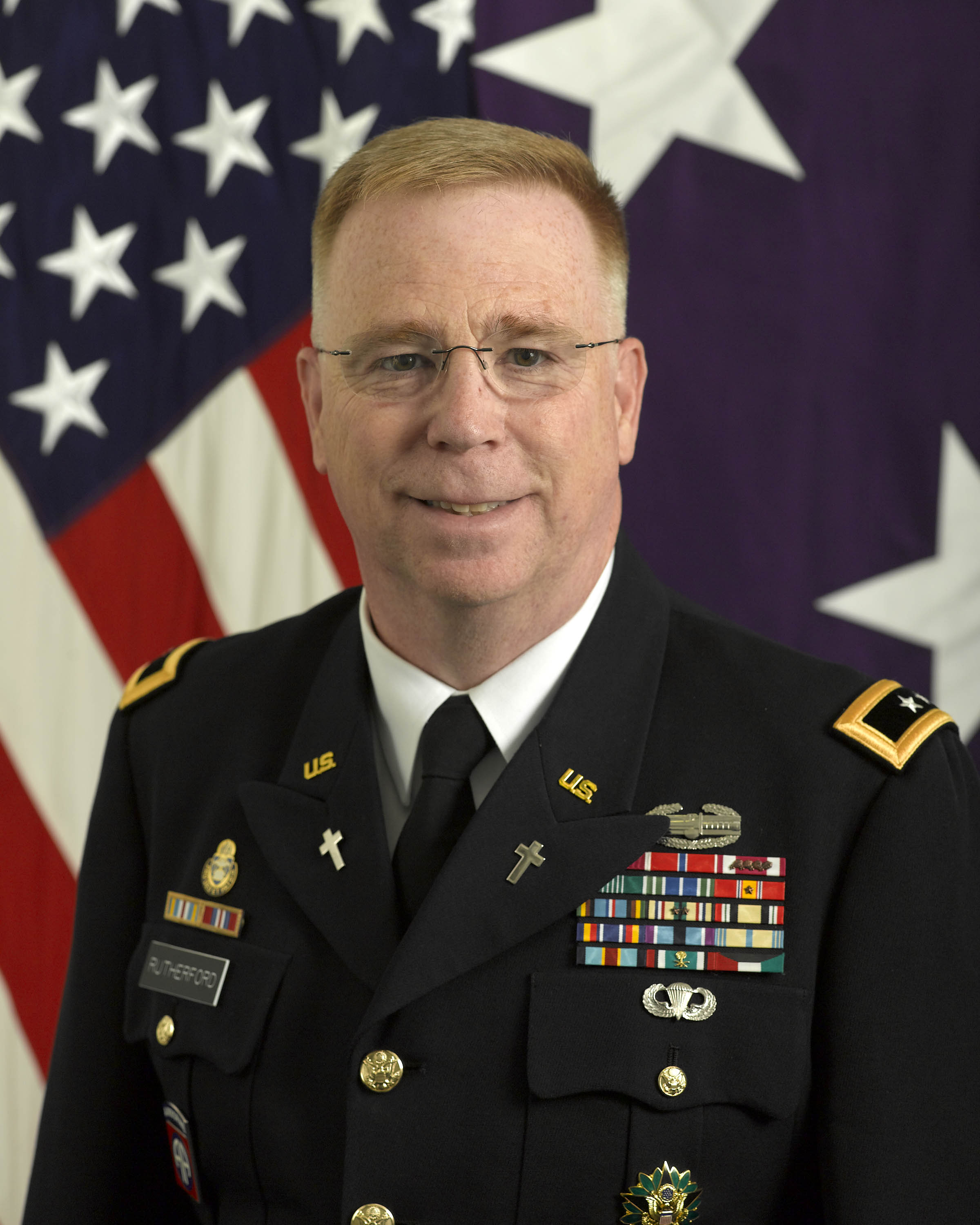
- Official portrait of CH (MG) Rutherford, 2011
- Born: 4 August 1955 (age 71); Kinderhook, New York, U.S.
- Education: University at Albany (BA); University of Rochester (MDiv); U.S. Army War College (MSS)
- Military career
- Allegiance: United States
- Branch: United States Army; Army Reserve (1977‍–‍1990)
- Service years: 1977–2015
- Rank: Major general
- Commands: U.S. Army Chaplain Corps (CCH)
- Conflicts: Gulf War; War on terror; Iraq War
- Awards: Distinguished Service Medal; Legion of Merit (3); Bronze Star Medal; Meritorious Service Medal (5)
- Church: Catholic (Latin Church)

Orders
- Ordination: 1981 by Howard Hubbard

Donald L. Rutherford (born 4 August 1955) is an American Army officer and a Roman Catholic priest of the Roman Catholic Diocese of Albany who served as the 23rd Chief of Chaplains of the United States Army.

== Biography ==
Rutherford attended the State University of New York, where he was a member of the ROTC program. He graduated with a Bachelor of Arts in English and Sociology. After receiving a delay of duty so that he could enter priestly formation at Saint Bernard's Seminary, Rutherford was ordained a priest for the Diocese of Albany in 1981. After ordination, he served in the United States Army Reserves as chaplain to the 364th General Hospital. He entered active duty in 1990.

Rutherford served in Operation Desert Shield, Operation Desert Storm, Operation Hurricane Andrew Relief, and Operation Iraqi Freedom. He served as chaplain to United States Army Europe and the 7th Army, Camp Victory, XVIII Airborne Corps, the 3rd Infantry Division, and the 82nd Airborne Division.

On 18 February 2011, Secretary of Defense Robert Gates announced that Rutherford was nominated for promotion to major general and assignment of Chief of Chaplains of the United States Army. He assumed this role on 7 July 2011. He was succeeded by Paul K. Hurley on 22 May 2015.

He currently serves as the Vicar for Clergy for the Diocese of Albany.

== Awards and decorations ==
Rutherford's awards and decorations include:

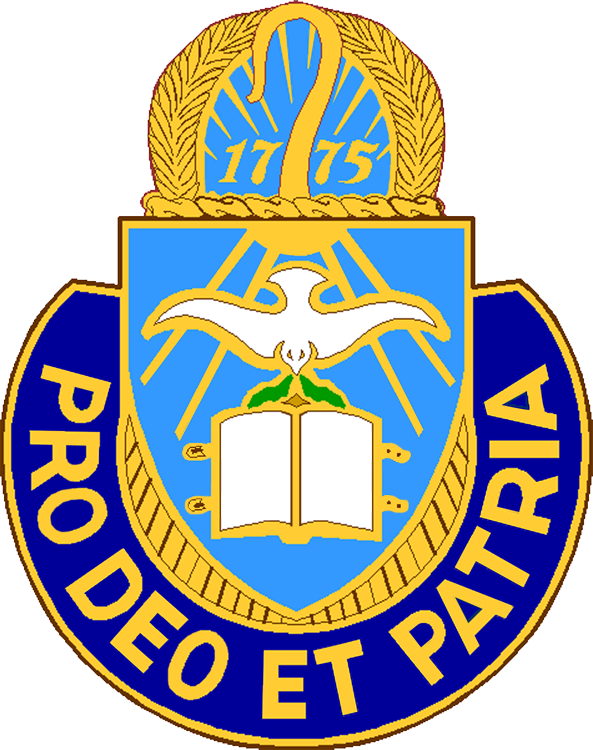
Combat Action Badge
Basic Parachutist Badge
Army Staff Identification Badge
82nd Airborne Division Combat Service Identification Badge
U.S. Army Chaplain Corps Distinctive Unit Insignia
4 Overseas Service Bars

Army Distinguished Service Medal
Legion of Merit (with two bronze oak leaf clusters)
Bronze Star
Meritorious Service Medal (with four bronze oak leaf clusters)
Army Commendation Medal
Army Achievement Medal
Army Presidential Unit Citation
Joint Meritorious Unit Award
Valorous Unit Award
Army Reserve Components Achievement Medal
National Defense Service Medal (with one bronze service star)
Armed Forces Expeditionary Medal
Southwest Asia Service Medal (with two bronze service stars)
Iraq Campaign Medal
Global War on Terrorism Service Medal
Humanitarian Service Medal
Armed Forces Reserve Medal
Army Service Ribbon
Overseas Service Ribbon
Kuwait Liberation Medal (Saudi Arabia)
Kuwait Liberation Medal (Kuwait)

== See also ==
- Armed Forces Chaplains Board
- Chiefs of Chaplains of the United States

Military offices
Preceded by Douglas L. Carver	Deputy Chief of Chaplains of the United States Army; 2008–2011	Succeeded by Charles R. Bailey
Preceded by Douglas L. Carver	Chief of Chaplains of the United States Army; 2011–2015	Succeeded by Paul K. Hurley
