= Deputy Chief of Chaplains =

Deputy Chief of Chaplains may refer to:

- Deputy Chief of Chaplains of the United States Army
- Chaplain of the Marine Corps, the senior U.S. Navy chaplain serving with the Marines: a position filled as a concurrent ("dual-hatted") billet since 2000 by the Deputy Chief of Chaplains of the United States Navy
- Deputy Chief of Chaplains of the United States Air Force
