= Paul K. Hurley =

United States Army general (born 1961)

The Reverend Paul K. Hurley
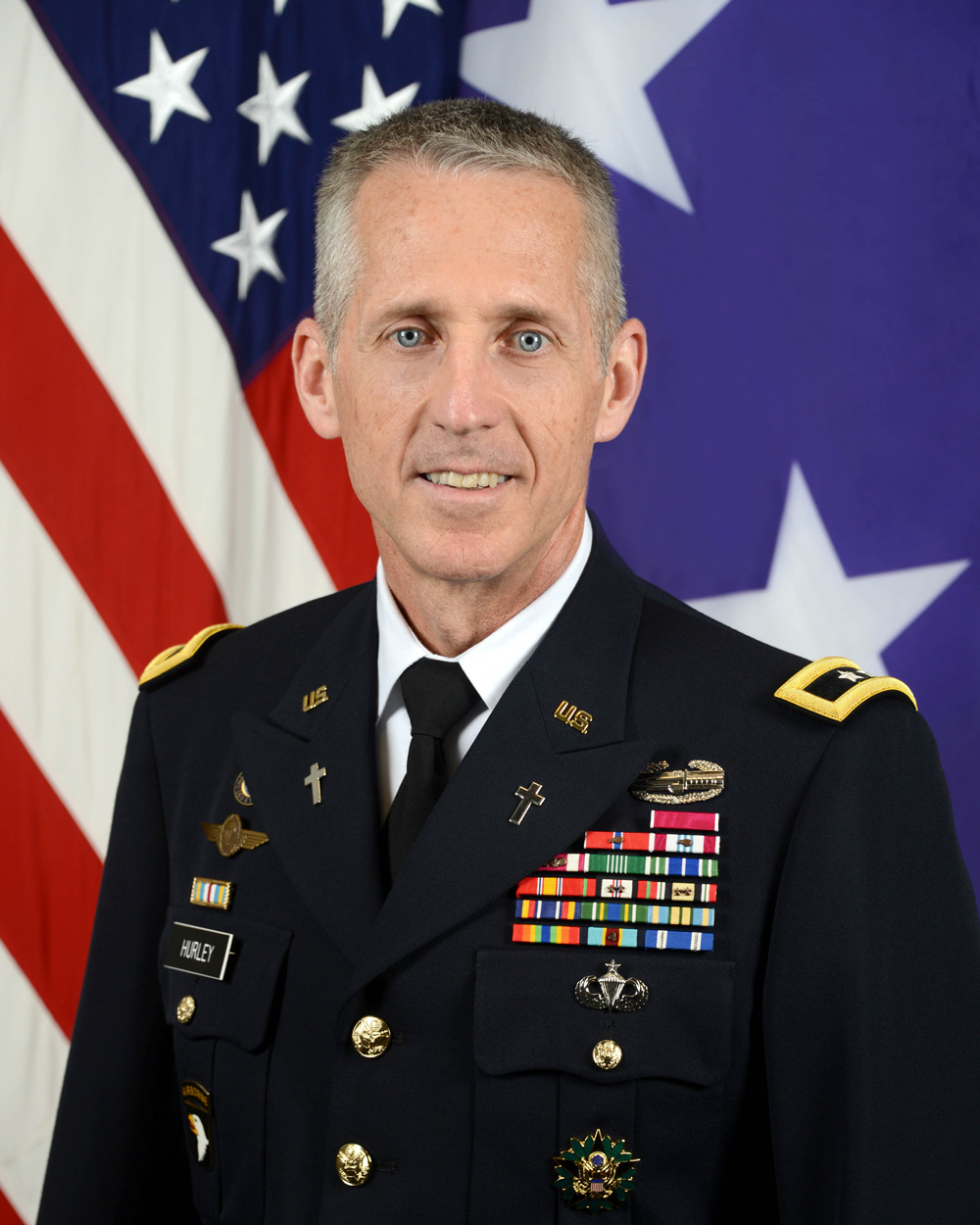
- Official portrait of CH (MG) Hurley, 2015
- Born: October 23, 1961 (age 64); Weymouth, Massachusetts, U.S.
- Alma mater: U.S. Military Academy; Saint John's Seminary
- Military career
- Allegiance: United States
- Branch: United States Army
- Service years: 1984–1990; 2000–2019
- Rank: Major general
- Commands: U.S. Army Chaplain Corps (CCH)
- Conflicts: War on terror; Iraq War; War in Afghanistan
- Awards: Legion of Merit; Bronze Star Medal (2); Defense Merit. Service Medal (2)
- Church: Catholic (Latin Church)

Orders
- Ordination: 1995 by Bernard Francis Law

Paul K. Hurley (born October 23, 1961) served as the 24th Chief of Chaplains of the United States Army and is a Roman Catholic priest of the Archdiocese of Boston. Fr. Hurley retired on May 30, 2019, being succeeded by his Deputy Chief of Chaplains, Thomas L. Solhjem.

On March 27, 2015, the Senate confirmed Hurley's promotion to major general and assignment of Chief of Chaplains of the United States Army.

== Life and career ==
Hurley attended the United States Military Academy at West Point, and graduated there with the Class of 1984. Following graduation, he served two assignments as a field artillery officer in Germany and Fort Bragg, North Carolina, before he began to discern a call to the priesthood. He resigned his commission in 1990 and attended Saint John's Seminary in Boston. He was ordained as a Roman Catholic priest in 1995 and spent five years as a parish priest in the Archdiocese of Boston before he rejoined the active duty Army Chaplain Corps in 2000. He most recently served as command chaplain for the XVIII Airborne Corps at Fort Bragg, North Carolina.

H. R. McMaster, a classmate of Hurley's from the West Point Class of 1984, swore Hurley in on May 22, 2015.

Hurley is currently the pastor of St. Bonaventure Parish in Plymouth, Massachusetts.

== Awards and decorations ==
Combat Action Badge
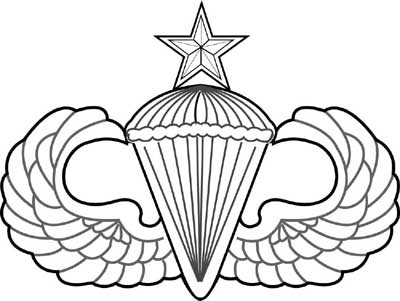
Senior Parachutist Badge
Army Staff Identification Badge
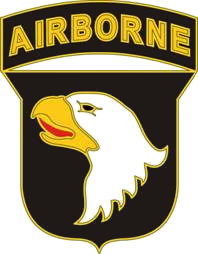
101st Airborne Division Combat Service Identification Badge
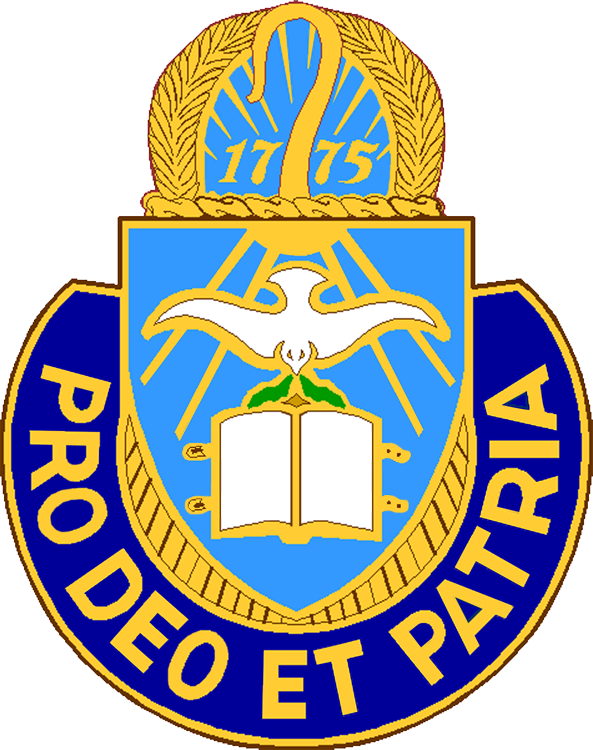
U.S. Army Chaplain Corps Distinctive Unit Insignia
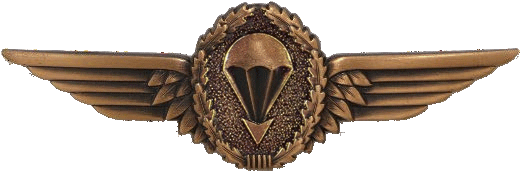
German Parachutist Badge in bronze
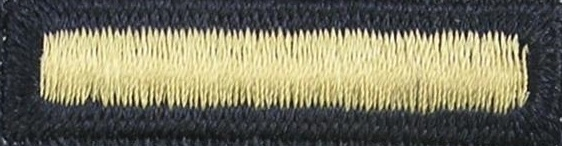
8 Overseas Service Bars

Legion of Merit
Bronze Star Medal with one bronze oak leaf cluster
Defense Meritorious Service Medal with oak leaf cluster
Meritorious Service Medal with three oak leaf clusters
Army Commendation Medal
Army Achievement Medal
Joint Meritorious Unit Award
National Defense Service Medal with one bronze service star
Afghanistan Campaign Medal with two service stars
Iraq Campaign Medal with two service stars
Global War on Terrorism Service Medal
Korea Defense Service Medal
Military Outstanding Volunteer Service Medal
Army Service Ribbon
Army Overseas Service Ribbon with bronze award numeral 4
NATO Medal for service with ISAF

== See also ==
- Armed Forces Chaplains Board
- Chiefs of Chaplains of the United States

Military offices
Preceded by Donald L. Rutherford	Chief of Chaplains of the United States Army; 2015–2019	Succeeded by Thomas L. Solhjem
