= Rixey, Virginia =

Unincorporated community in Virginia, United States

Coordinates: 38°04′44″N 77°22′56″W

Rixey is an unincorporated community in Caroline County, in the U.S. state of Virginia.
