= George F. Rixey =

United States Army chaplain (1888–1974)

George Foreman Rixey
- Born: March 2, 1888; Jonesburg, Missouri
- Died: May 13, 1974 (aged 86)
- Burial place: Arlington National Cemetery; Arlington, Virginia
- Military career
- Allegiance: US
- Branch: United States Army
- Service years: 1917–19??
- Rank: Brigadier General
- Conflicts: World War I World War II

George Foreman Rixey, USA (March 2, 1888 – May 13, 1974) was an American Army officer who served as the 1st Deputy Chief of Chaplains of the United States Army from 1942 to 1945.

== Biography ==
Rixey served as a line officer in World War I in France as a first lieutenant, and then accepted a commission as a military chaplain. On returning to the United States after the war, he served in a variety of different locations, and was later promoted to major in 1931.

He was awarded the rank of brigadier general at the end of World War II, which established that as the grade for the office. After the war he was moved to the Office of the Inspector General where he served until his retirement. General Rixey, his wife Leslie Young (1880–1976) and their son George Jr. (1911–1914) are buried at Arlington National Cemetery, section 2, grave E-280.

== Quotes ==
Regarding the duties of army chaplains:

"To the chaplain comes the extraordinary privilege of interpreting to those potential potential saviors of our nation how the high qualities of citizenship and social morality may be transmitted into military value and effective military action."

Military offices
Preceded by Inaugural	Deputy Chief of Chaplains of the United States Army; 1942–1945	Succeeded by Patrick J. Ryan
