= Bay Ridge United Church =

Coordinates: 40.62734°N 74.01926°W

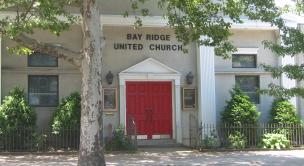
Bay Ridge United Church

Bay Ridge United Church (BRUC) was located at 636 Bay Ridge Parkway in the Bay Ridge section of Brooklyn, New York. The congregation was a blend of two churches from two similar but different denominations and was a member of both the Reformed Church in America and the Presbyterian Church (U.S.A.).

== South Reformed Church ==
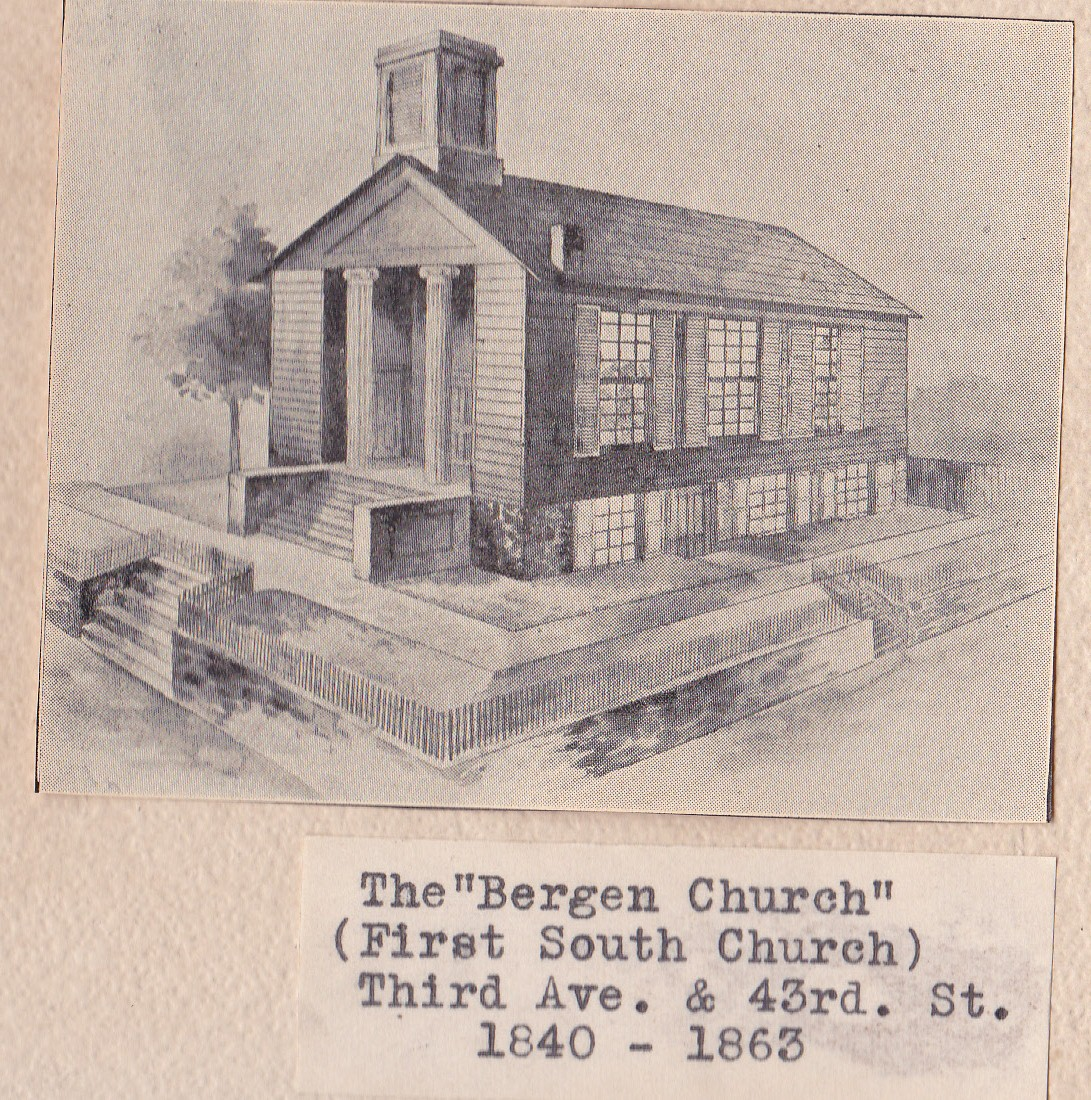
Line drawing of Bergen Church

The South Reformed Church, an offshoot of the Old First Reformed Church (Brooklyn, New York) was organized in 1838. Its first building was a plain wooden structure measuring 40 by 55 feet which stood on the corner of 43rd Street and Third Avenue. Mr. George King was the architect, the Messrs. Rhoades, the carpenters, and the Messrs. Buchanan and Van Nostrand the masons, having completed it at a contract price of $1660 on June 23, 1840.

Its first pastor was Rev. Cornelius Cullan Ardsdale. He was succeeded by the Rev. Dr. Samuel Merrill Woodbridge who was installed on Dec. 12 in 1841. In 1890 he was Dean of the Theological Seminary of the Reformed Church of New Brunswick, New Jersey.

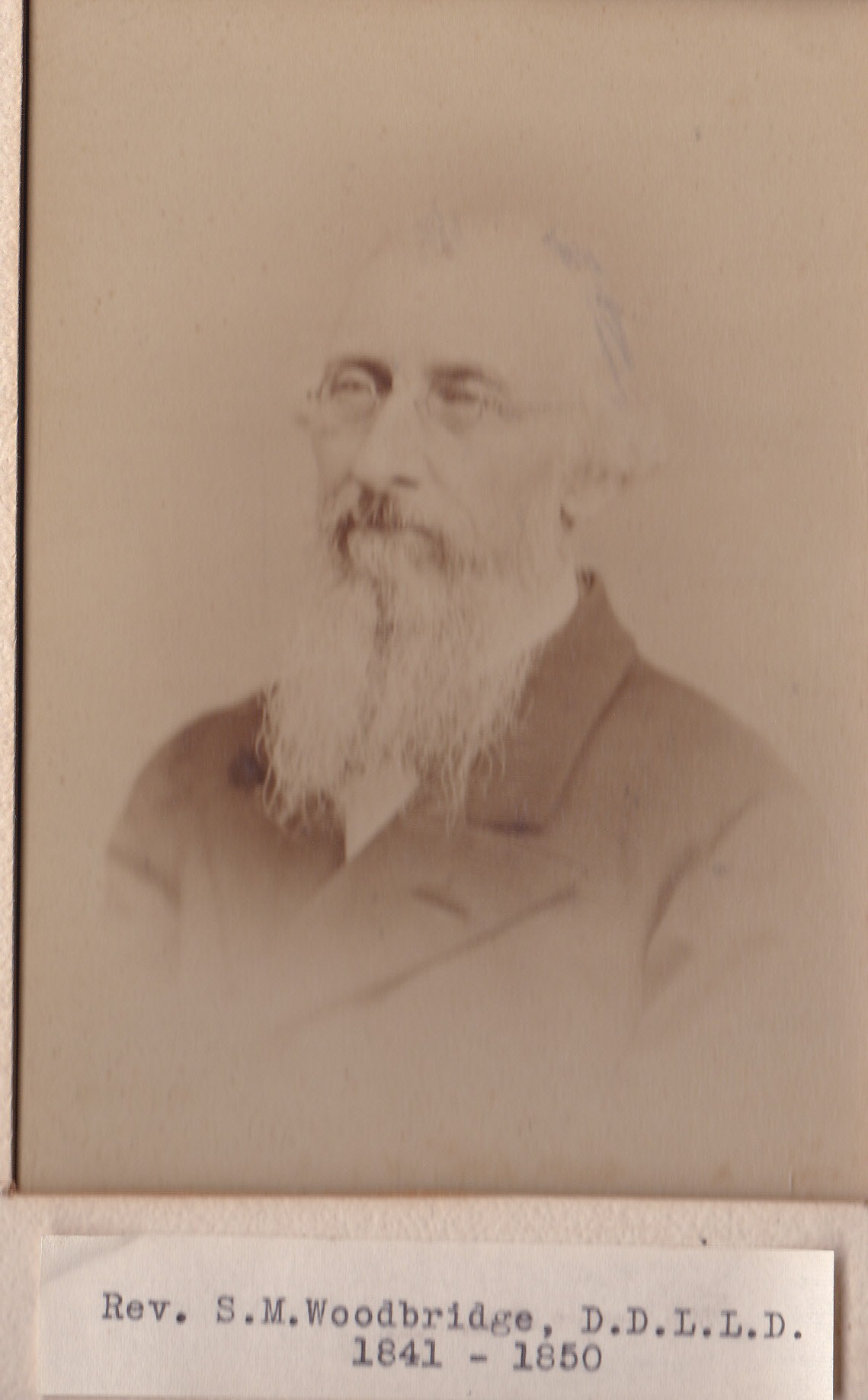
Rev. Samuel Merrill Woodbridge

During his pastorate the consistory bought the building then owned by the Fourth Presbyterian Church (New School) of the City of Brooklyn (Brooklyn Fourth) located on 3rd Avenue between 20th and 21st Street, Brooklyn, which was organized by the Third Presbytery of New York in the Village of Gowanus, in February, 1838. A house of worship was erected soon after, and the Rev. Robert R. Kellogg was installed June 4, 1839, by the Presbytery of Brooklyn. He was dismissed on 7 December following, and the congregation being few, and oppressed with debt, the church was dissolved by the presbytery, May 9, 1842. Subsequently, the building was purchased by the Third Dutch church, and for several years services were held alternately in the morning and evening in the two churches. About 1850, the congregation divided into two portions; those worshipping in the 22nd Street church known as the North Gowanus Church moved to Twelfth Street, where they were then known as the Twelfth Street Reformed Church. At the South Reformed Church the Rev. Dr. Woodbridge's pastorate ended on April 29, 1850. He was succeeded by the Rev. Jonathan M. Rowland, who was called from the Presbyterian Church on May 18, 1852, but who died suddenly on Sunday Oct. 2, 1853.

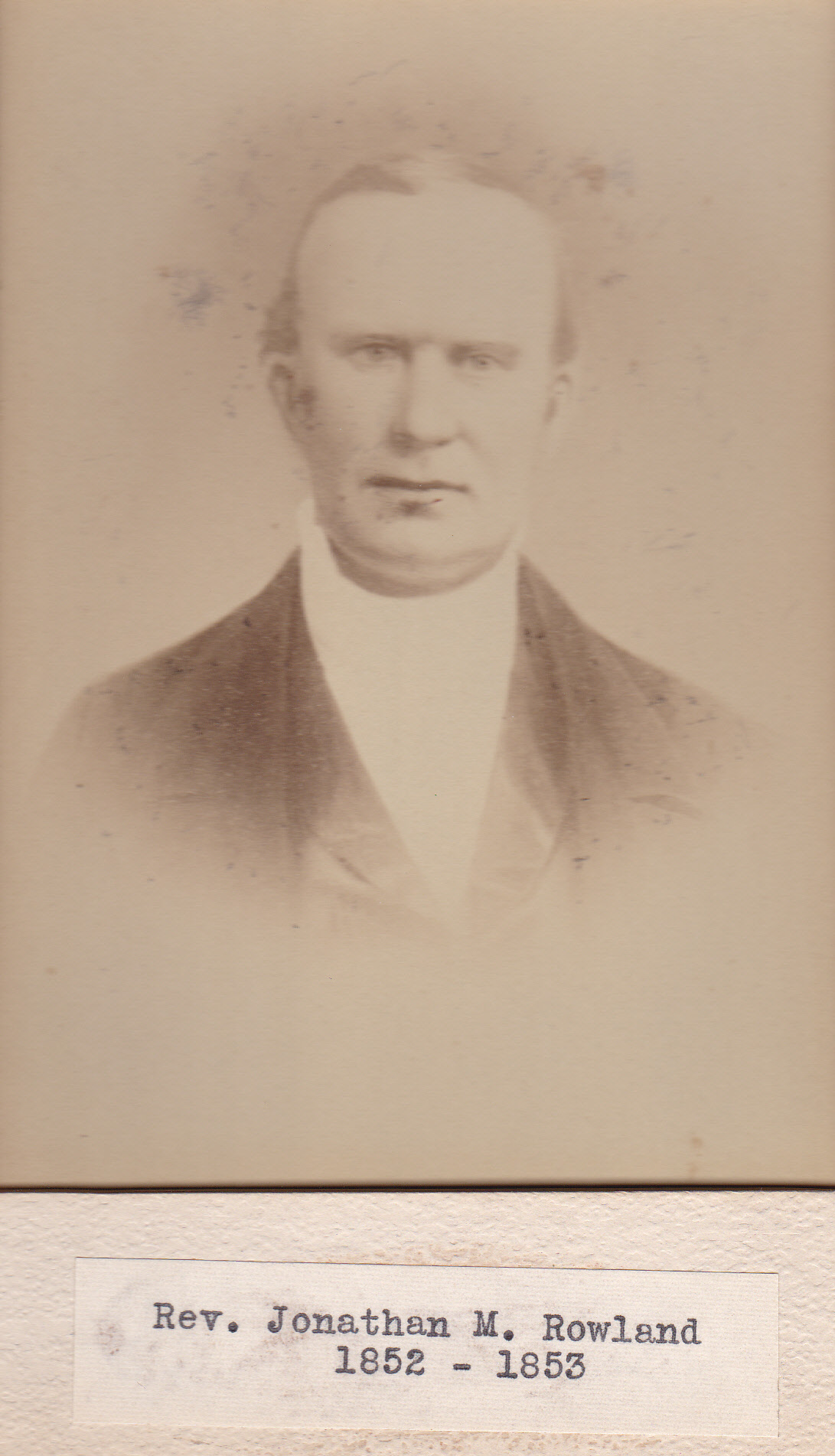

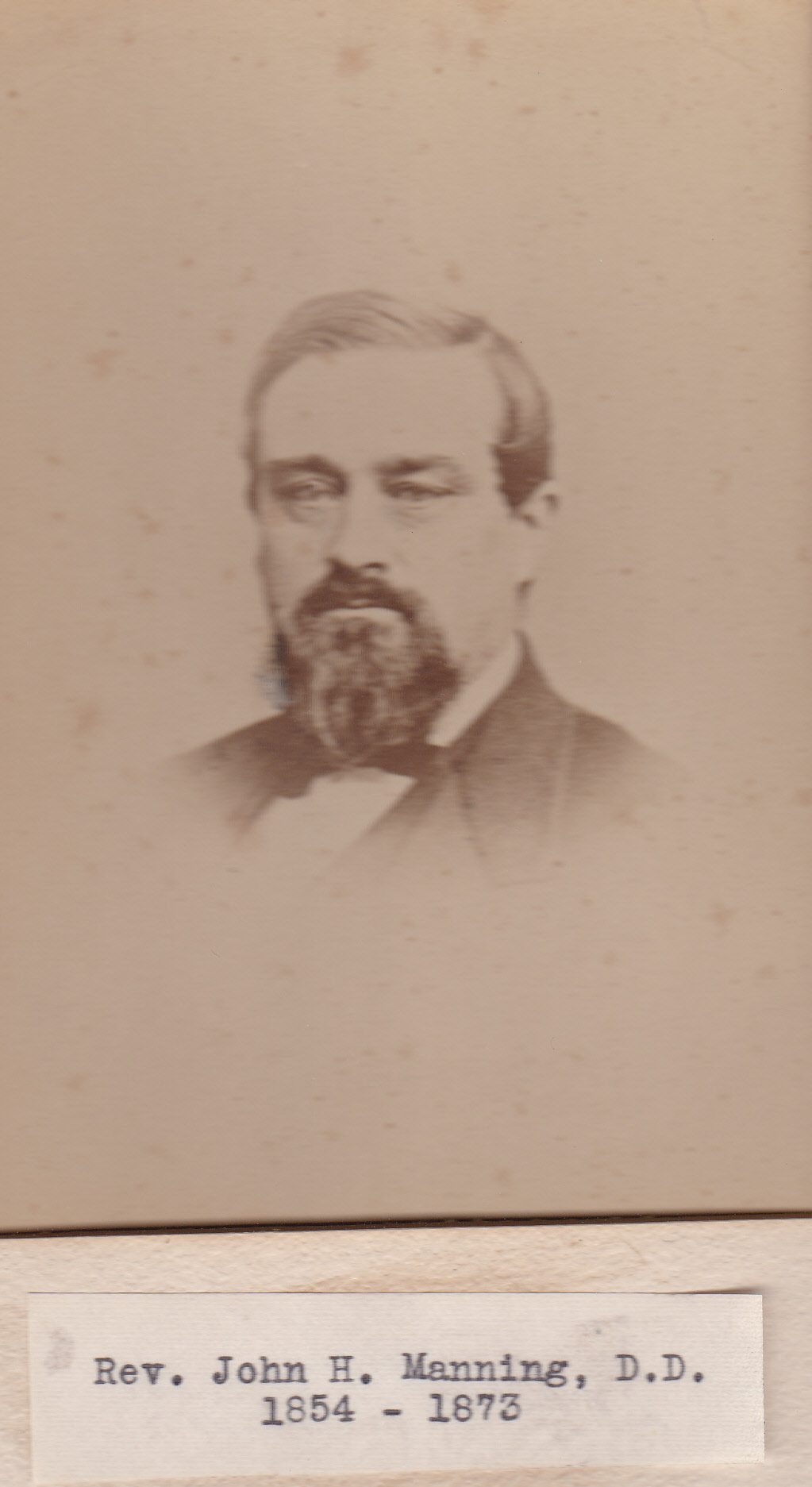

There was an interval of a few years when the church was without a pastor. On July 17, 1854, the Rev. John H. Manning became pastor and continued until June 30, 1873. During his pastorate the church went through a crisis with the yellow fever in July and August 1856. Three of the four members of the church consistory died of the disease and the church membership was decimated. The neighborhood was panic-stricken, but the church bravely kept at its post.

In March 1863, the church building was destroyed by fire. The fire was said to have been caused by a heating stove. After meeting in P.S. 2 at 47th Street and 3rd Avenue, in 1875 the new church edifice at 52nd Street and 3rd Avenue, which had been begun a few years before, was dedicated. It cost about $35,000. The church started with seventeen members and grew to 200 members, with a Sunday school of 325 in 1890.

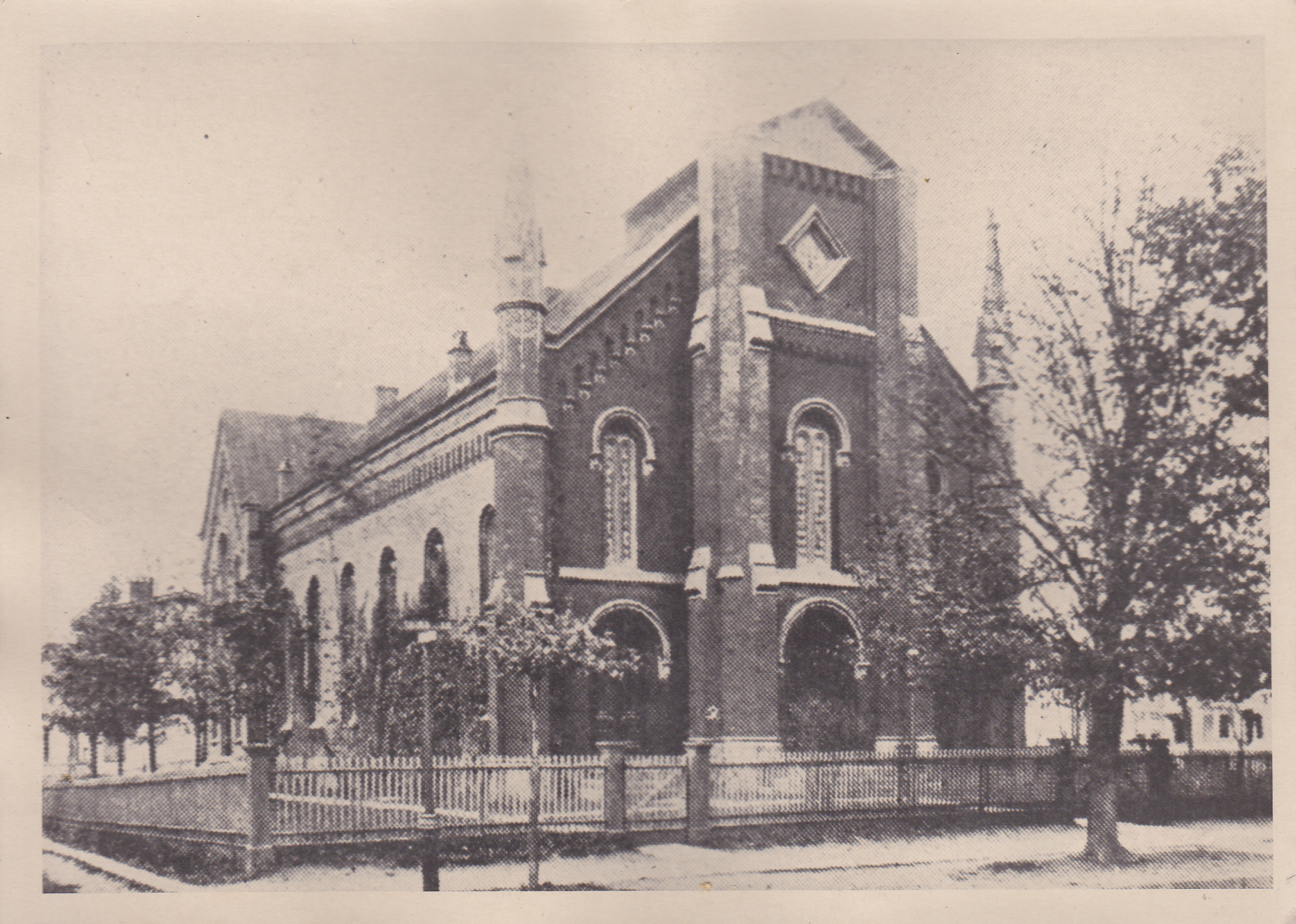
52nd Street Church

Rev. Dr. Henry.V.S. Myers was pastor from Oct. 15, 1874 to May 1, 1882.

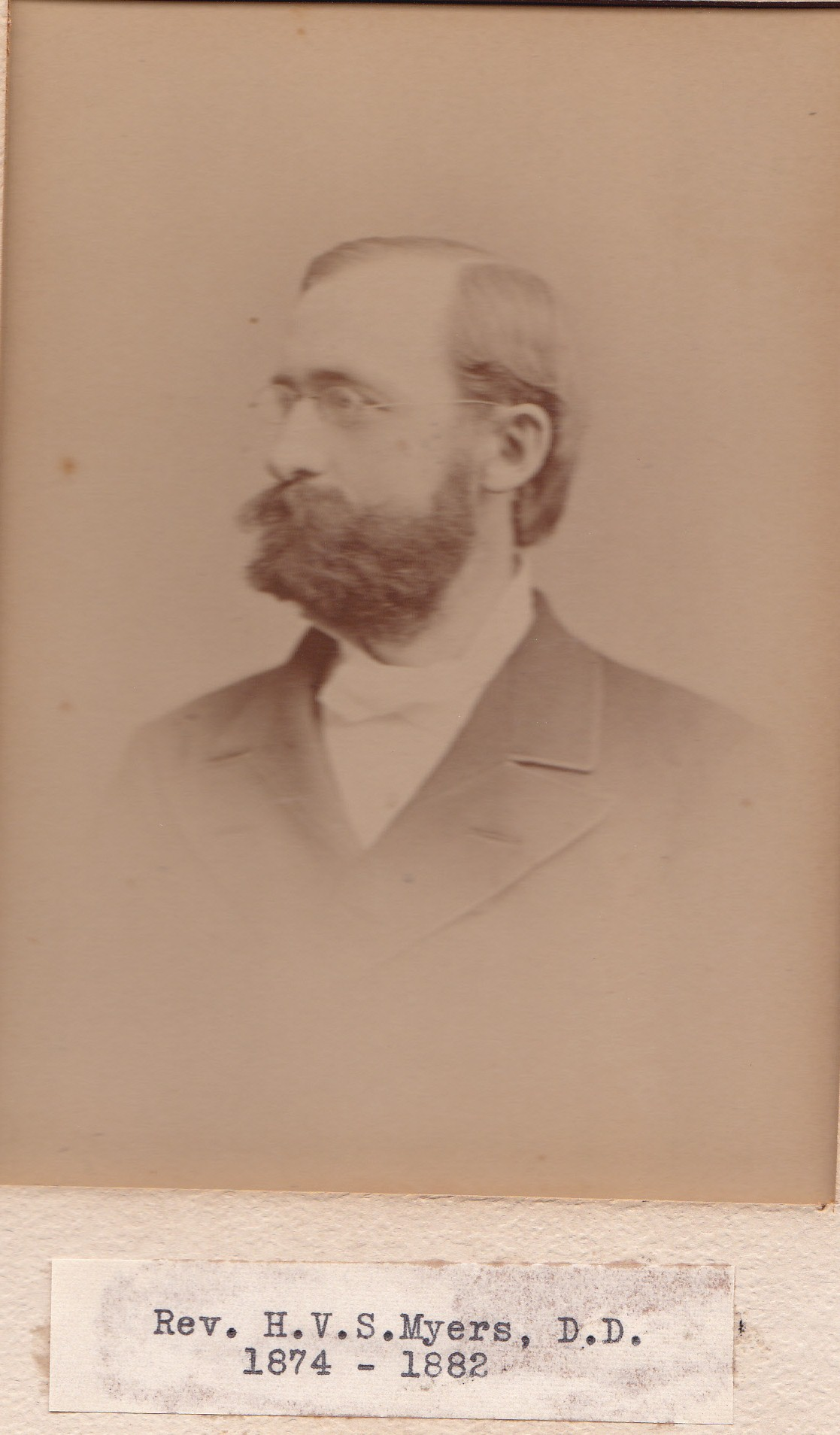

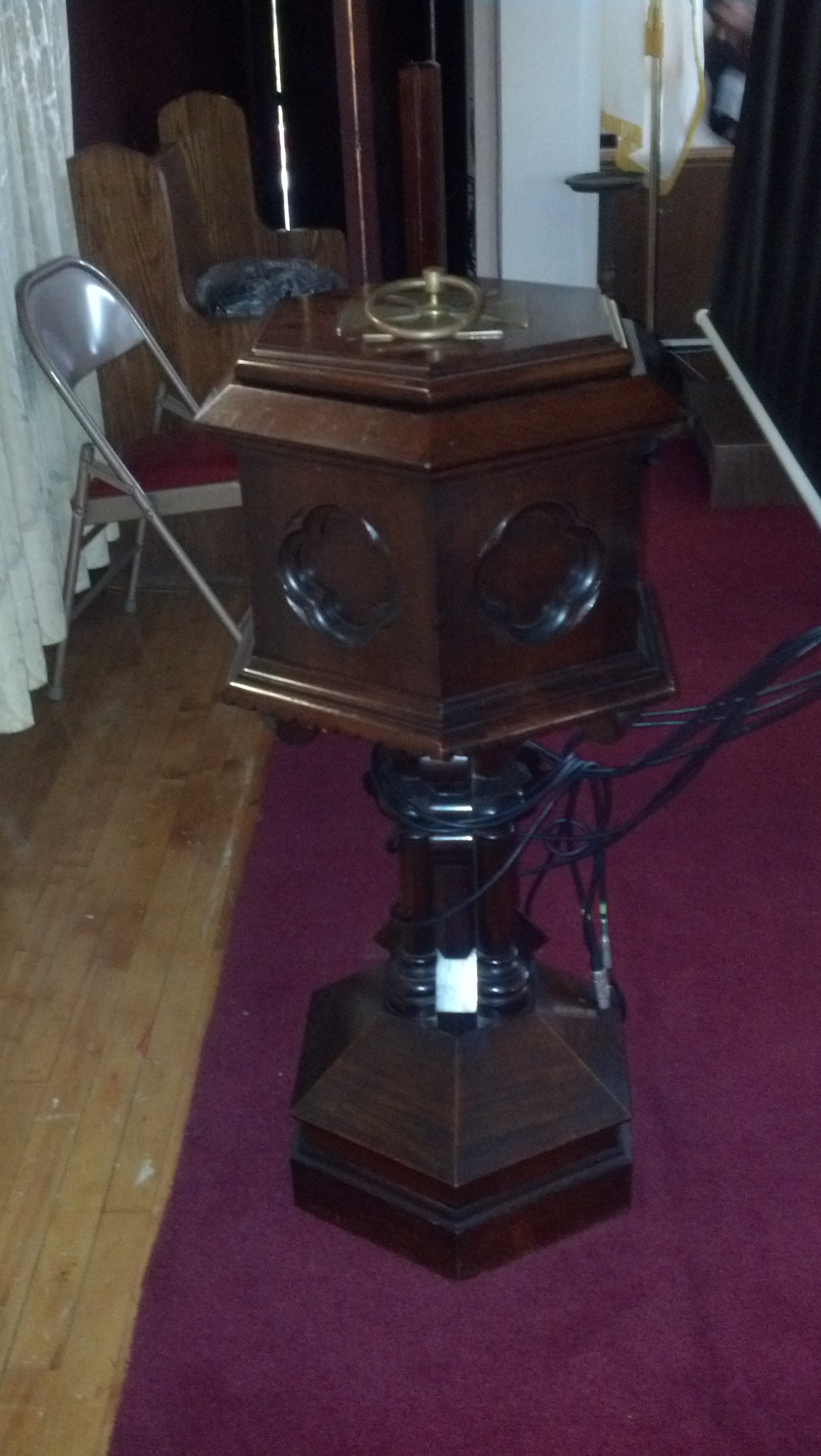
South Reformed baptismal font

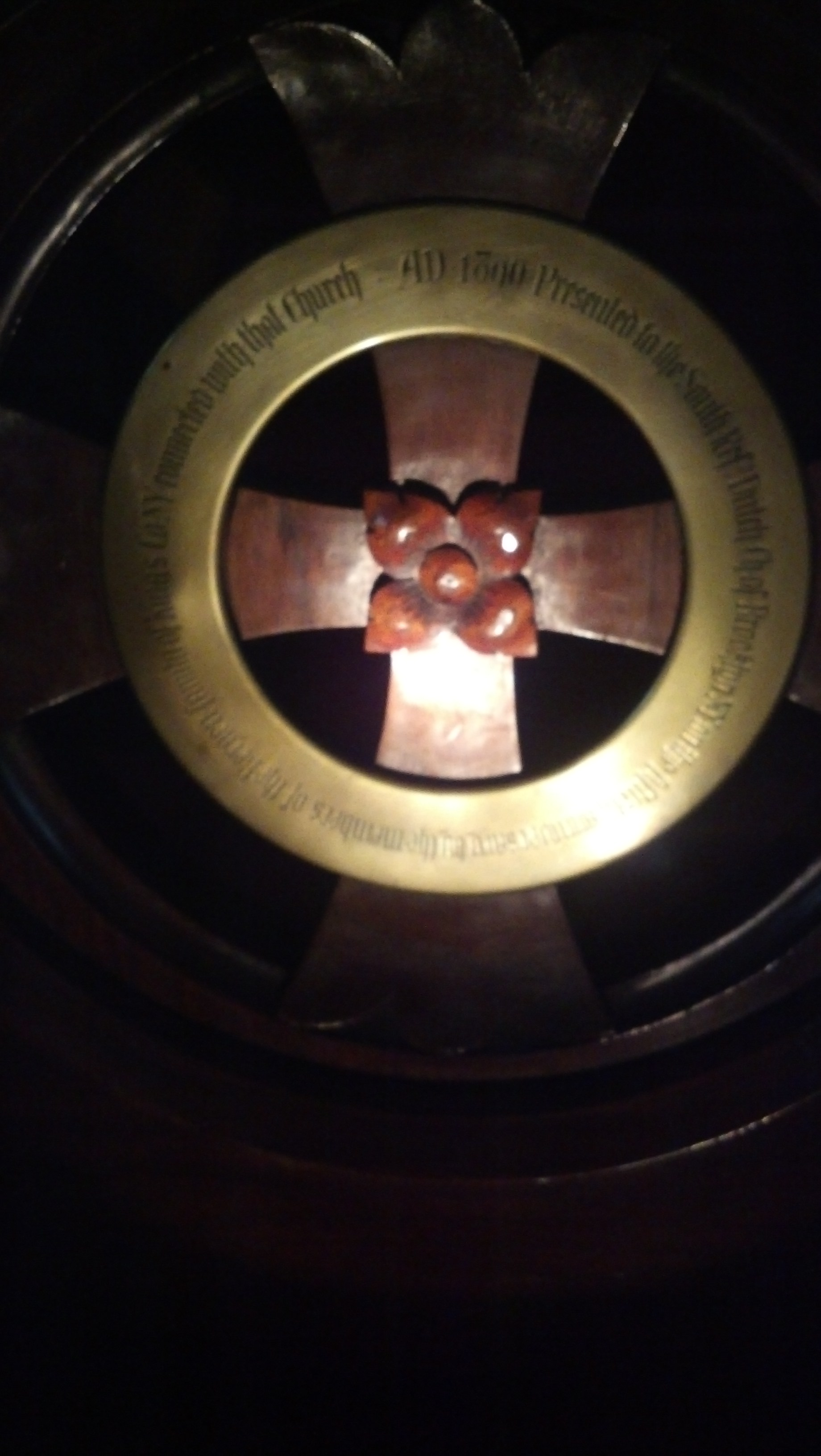
Baptismal font inscription: "The Gift of the Bergen Family of Kings County of NY to the Reformed Dutch Church of Brooklyn, NY on its Fiftieth Anniversary A.D. 1890"

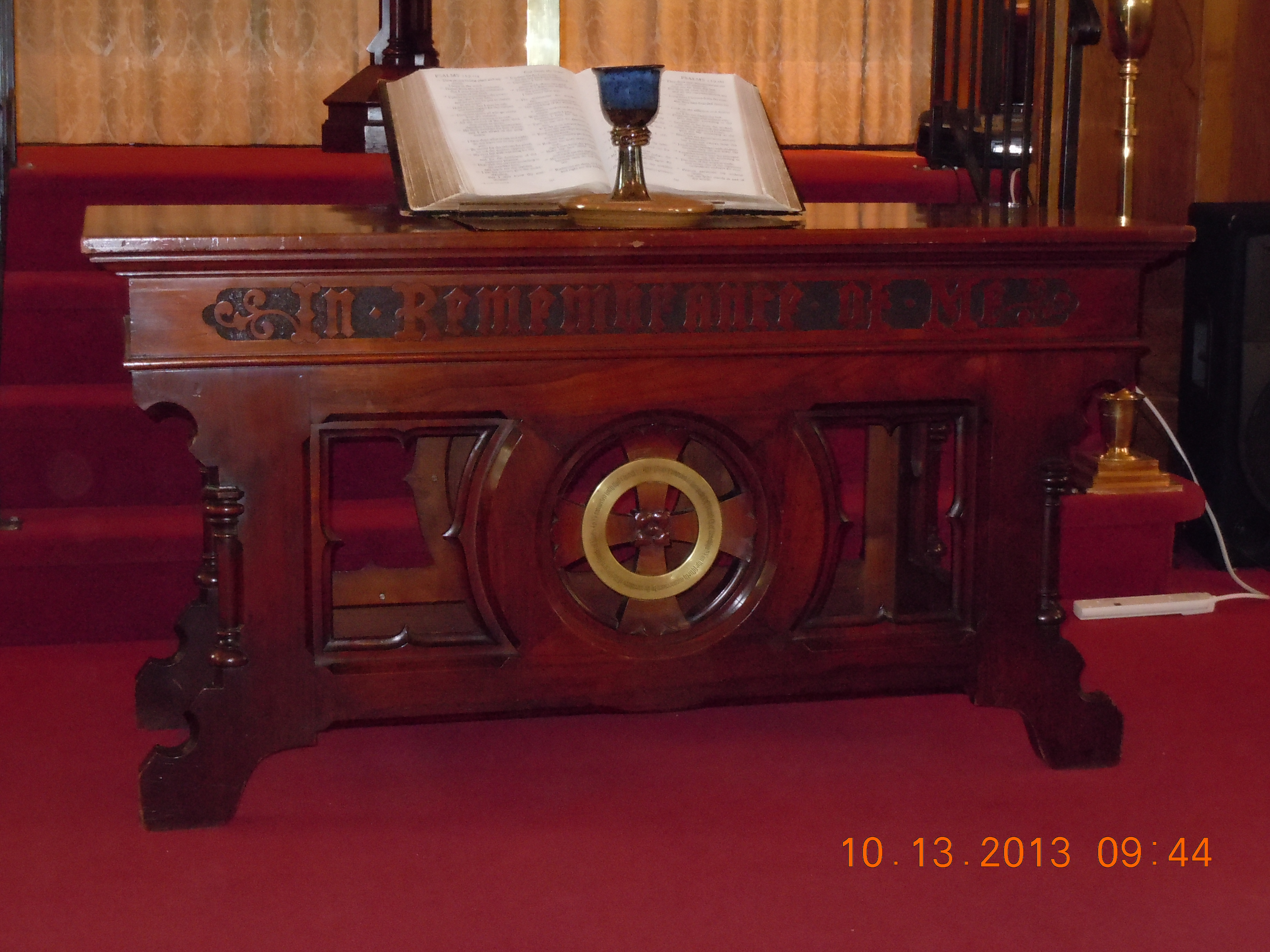
South Reformed Church communion table

The Rev. Alfred DeWitt Mason was pastor from November, 1882 until October 12, 1891. On December 7, 1890, the evening service was occupied in the formal receiving of a baptismal font, communion table, kneeling stool and collection plates given to the church by the members of the Bergen family.

When the church was formed fifty years earlier the territory of Bay Ridge was very sparsely settled and would have discouraged a less hardy class of people. The several branches of Bergens were the real reason for the permanent establishment. While many of the Bergens had left the neighborhood, fifty-one joined in the tribute to the church. Mr. deHart Bergen read the deed of the gift and the list of fifty donors and handed it over to the pastor. Teunis G. Bergen, grandson of Teunis G. Bergen, followed in a very brief address, speaking on behalf of the family. The communion table and chair were massive and made of black walnut.

Rev. John Tallmadge Bergen was pastor from April 26, 1892, to September 2, 1895, and the Rev. Benjamin E. Dickhaut from 1896 to 1903.

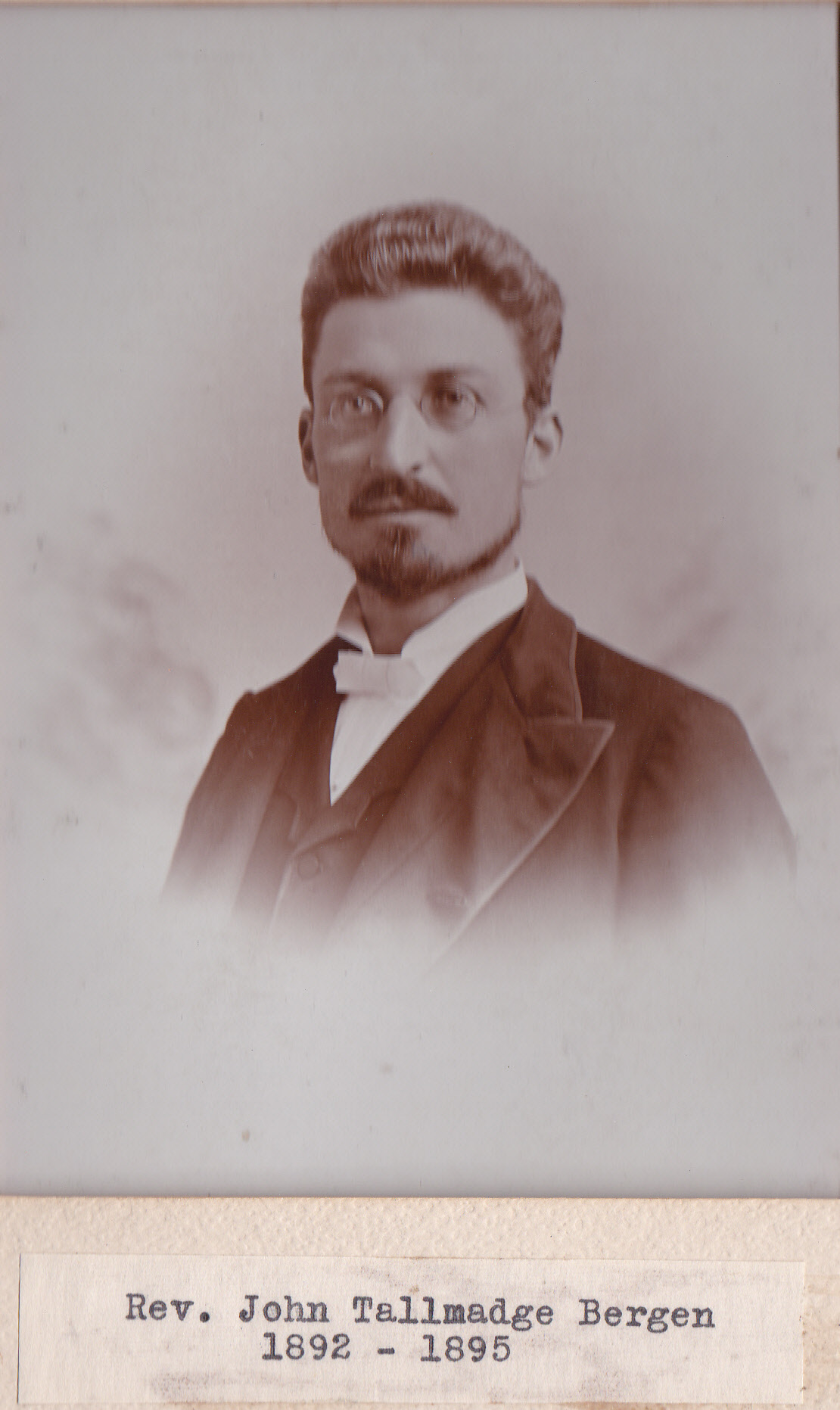

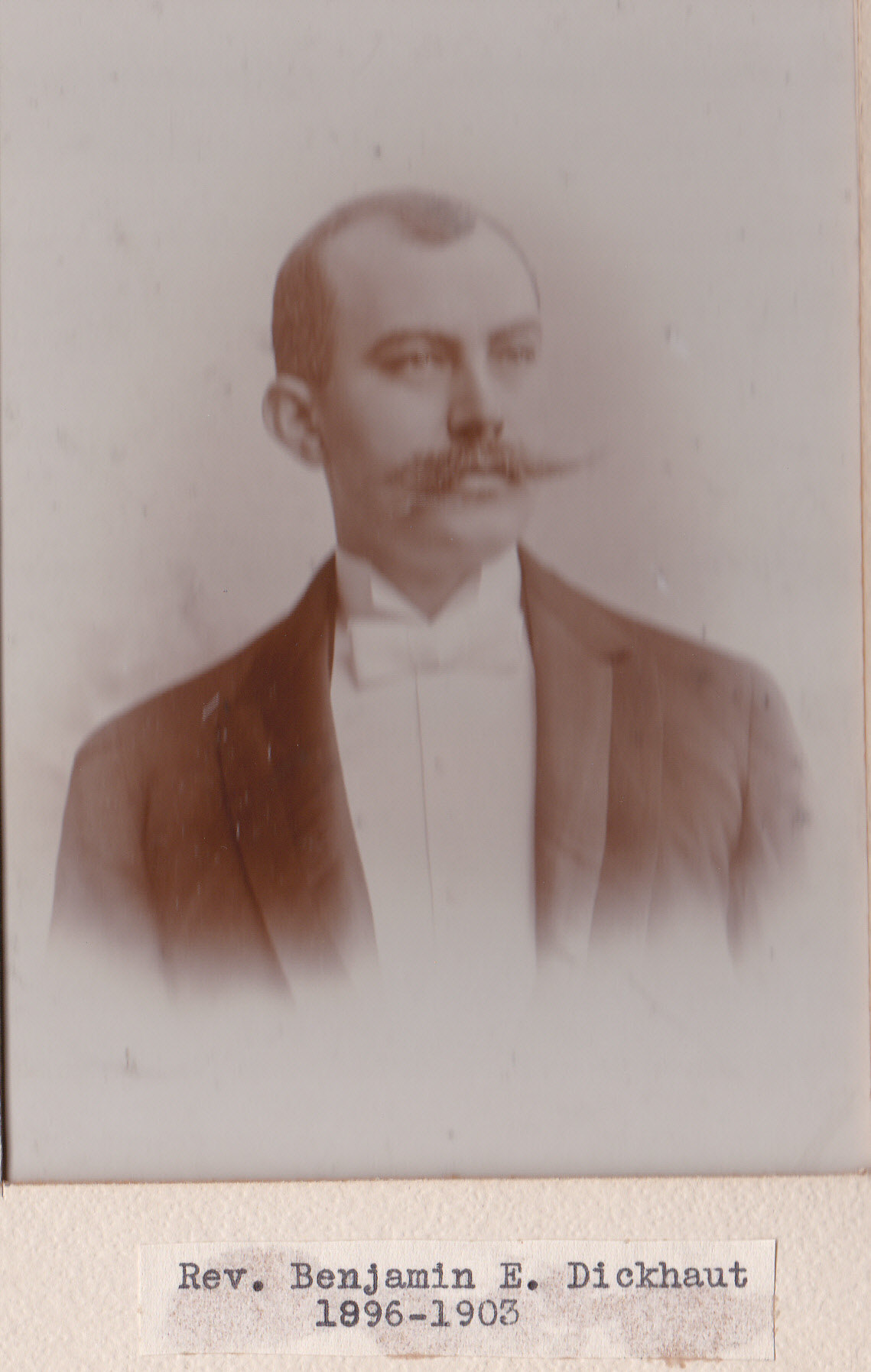

As the congregation grew, the church needed to expand to a new location, so they moved to 55th Street and Fourth Avenue. The cornerstone of the church was laid in on Saturday afternoon, September 6, 1902. The pastor presided and a large children's chorus sung under his leadership "Praise Ye the Father" and "The Psalms." He read the contents of the box that was placed in the stone. The church was called the South Reformed Church. The contents of the box included a photograph of Theodore Roosevelt, President of the United States, bearing his autograph and sent by himself, copies of the Brooklyn Daily Eagle and Brooklyn Daily Times and many church items. The new building was of Gothic architecture and was built by the Church Construction Company of Manhattan. W.L. Spicer was the architect. H.L. Spence was Chair of the Building Committee. The first steps towards securing the property were taken in 1899. The noise of both elevated and trolley along Third Avenue proved too much and the old church was sold to Spence Brothers who razed it and erected flat houses on the site. The old church was sold for $30,000 which went towards the $80,000 for the new building.

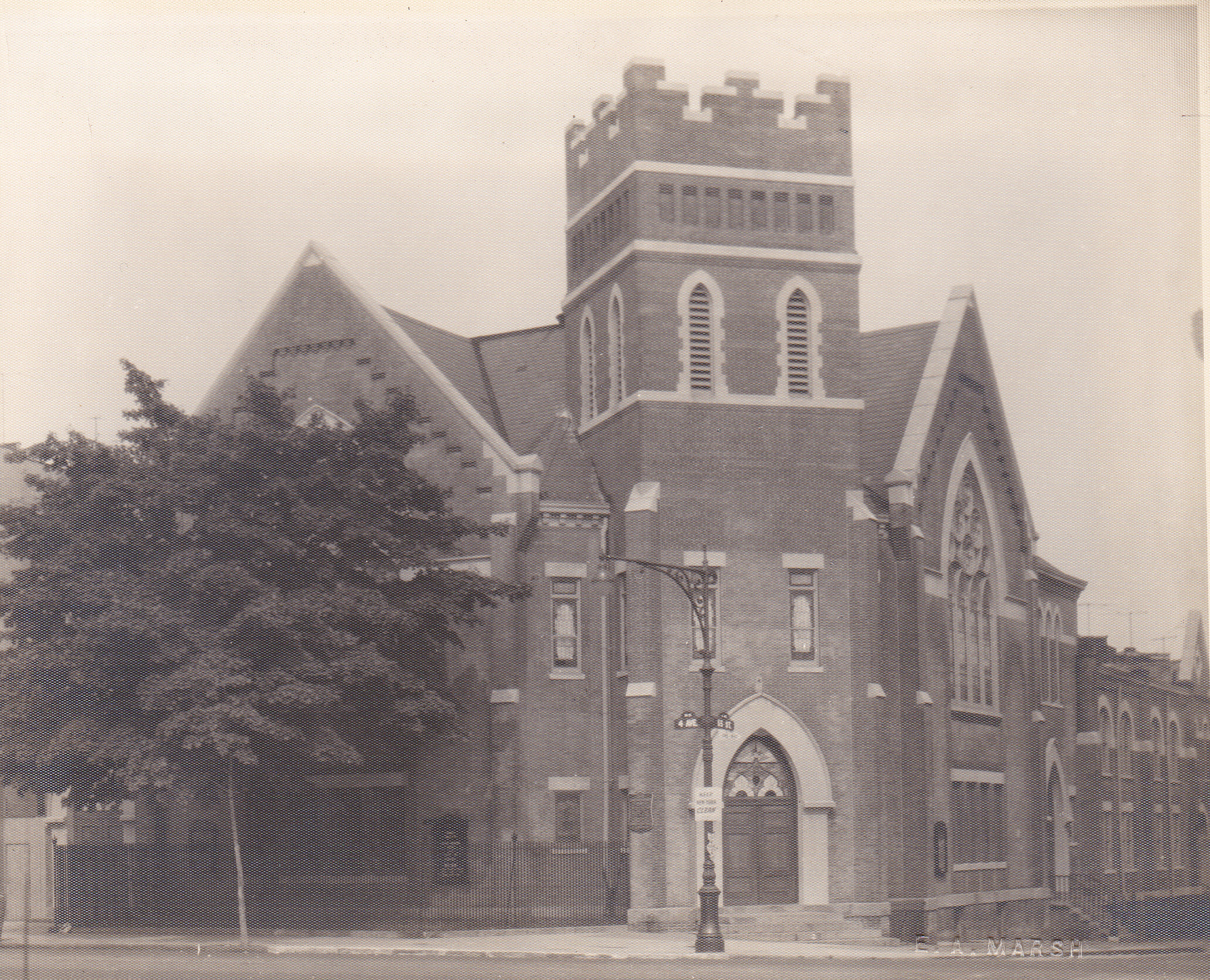
55th Street Church

The first service was held on March 16, 1904, with the Reverend Dr. William J. MacDonald as its pastor. He served the church from February 11, 1904, to April 19, 1917. In an M. P. Moller ledger book is a handwritten copy of the Letter of Agreement of March 26, 1910, between Möller and the South Reformed Church. Möller agreed to build a two-manual organ with tubular-pneumatic action and casing of quartered oak that would be ready for use on or before the 1st day of September 1910; however, the organ was not shipped until September 3. Möller also replaced the old water motor with a new one. The total cost of the organ was $4,500, less an allowance of $1,000 for the old organ, then in the church, which became the property of Möller.

In 1915, the Brooklyn Home Talk reported that there were 1500 students in the Sunday School.

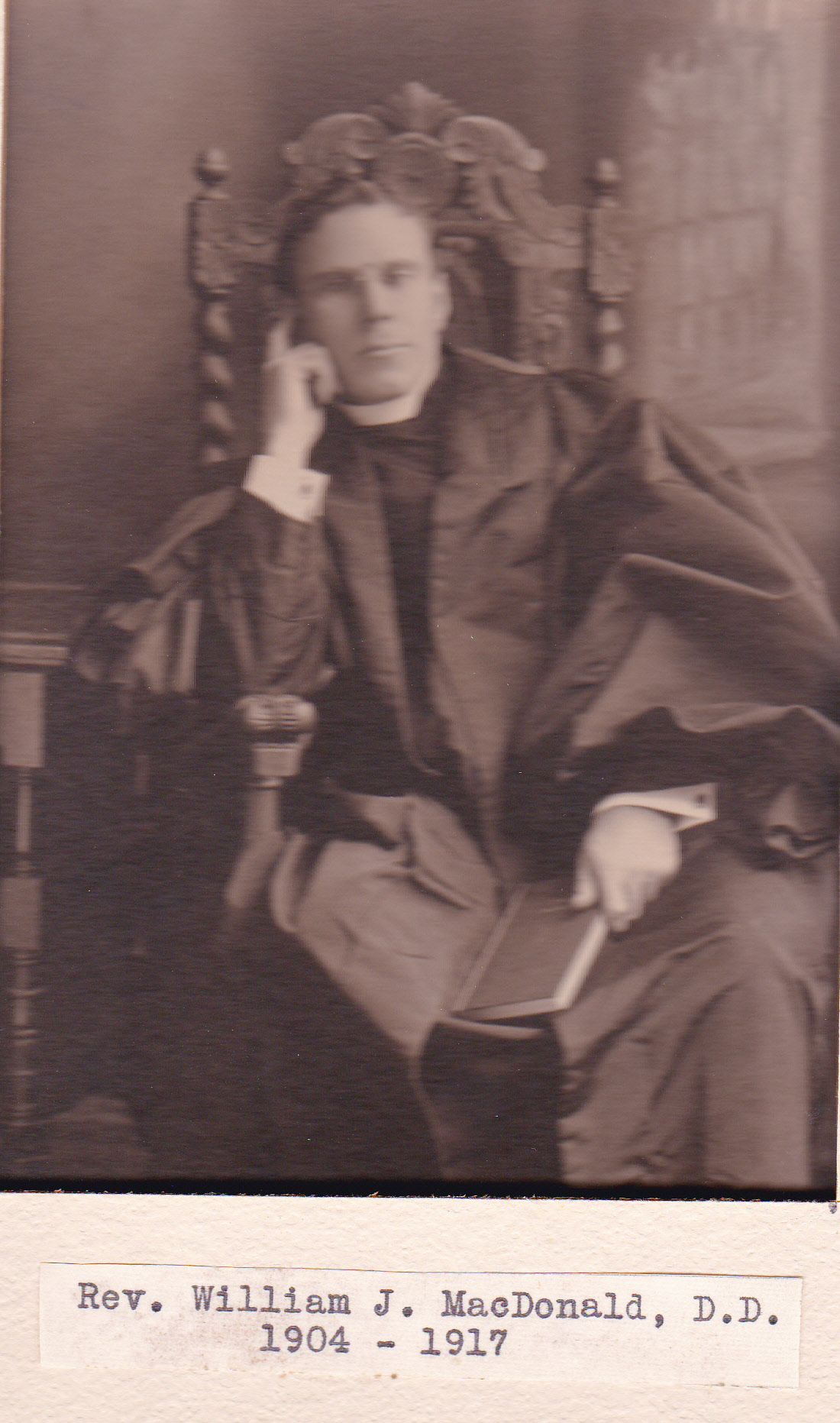

On its 75th anniversary it was stated that South Reformed was the pioneer church in that section of Brooklyn and was the parent of Greenwood Heights, the Twelfth Street and the Bay Ridge Reformed Churches. Bay Ridge Reformed eventually became the current Union Church of Bay Ridge.

The Rev. Dr. Robert A. Watson was pastor from October, 1917 to December 31, 1927. In 1918 the church had a membership of 1198 with a Sunday school of 1415. $10,560 was raised and the property value was $75,000. Dr. Watson accepted a call to the First Dutch Reformed Church of Jamaica in December, 1927.

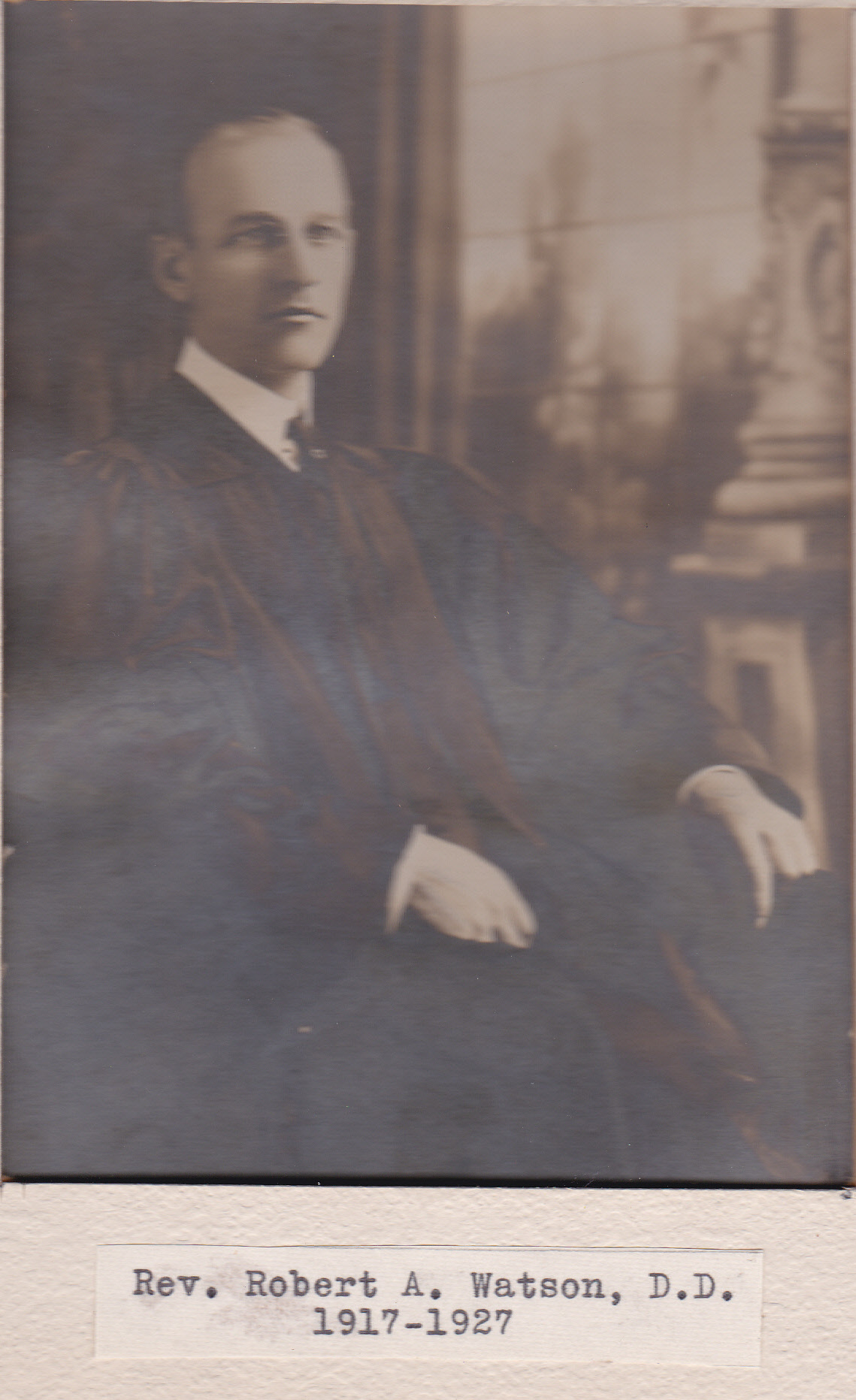

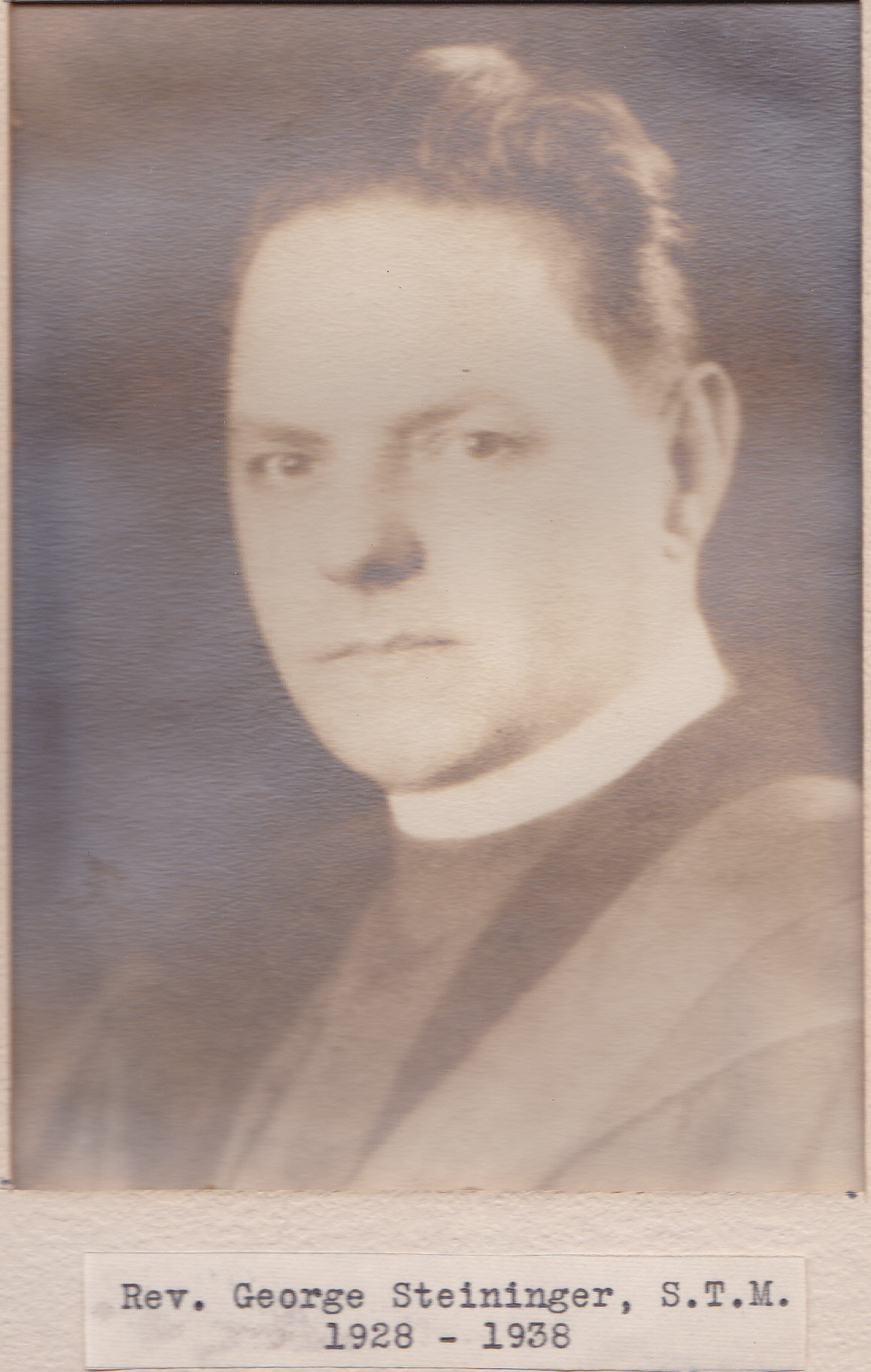

The Rev. George Steininger was installed as pastor on May 10, 1928, and served until November 1, 1938. "The Yearly Report January 1, 1929-1930" reported $11,541 in receipts and disbursements and a Sunday school of 500. In 1940 the church had a membership of 400 with a Sunday School enrollment of 350.

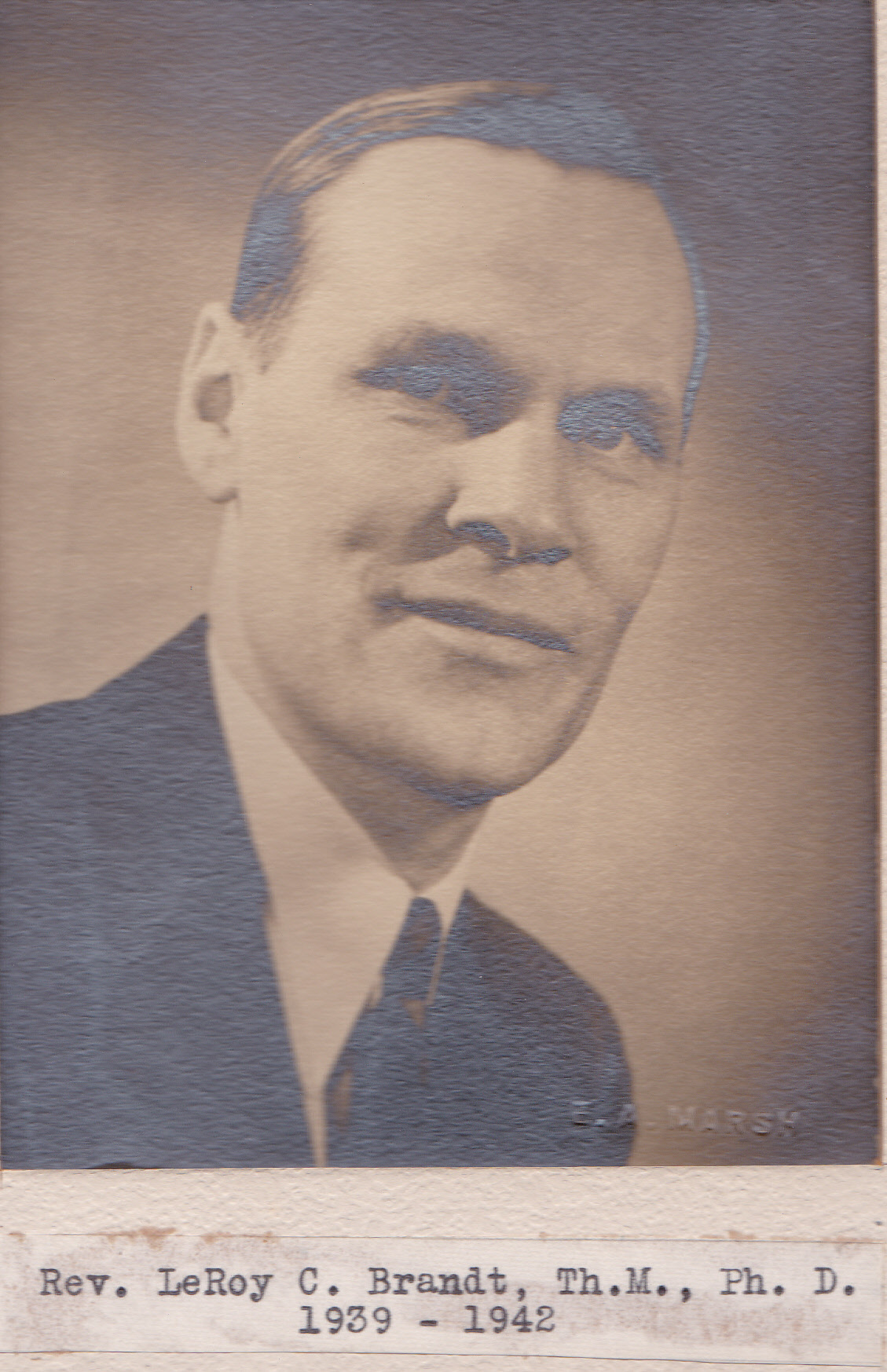

The Rev. Dr. Leroy C. Brandt was pastor from 1939 to 1942. On May 5, 1940, the church began the observation of its centenary. A number of special services and other events marked the anniversary. It closed on May 17 with a dinner at the Hotel Bossert.

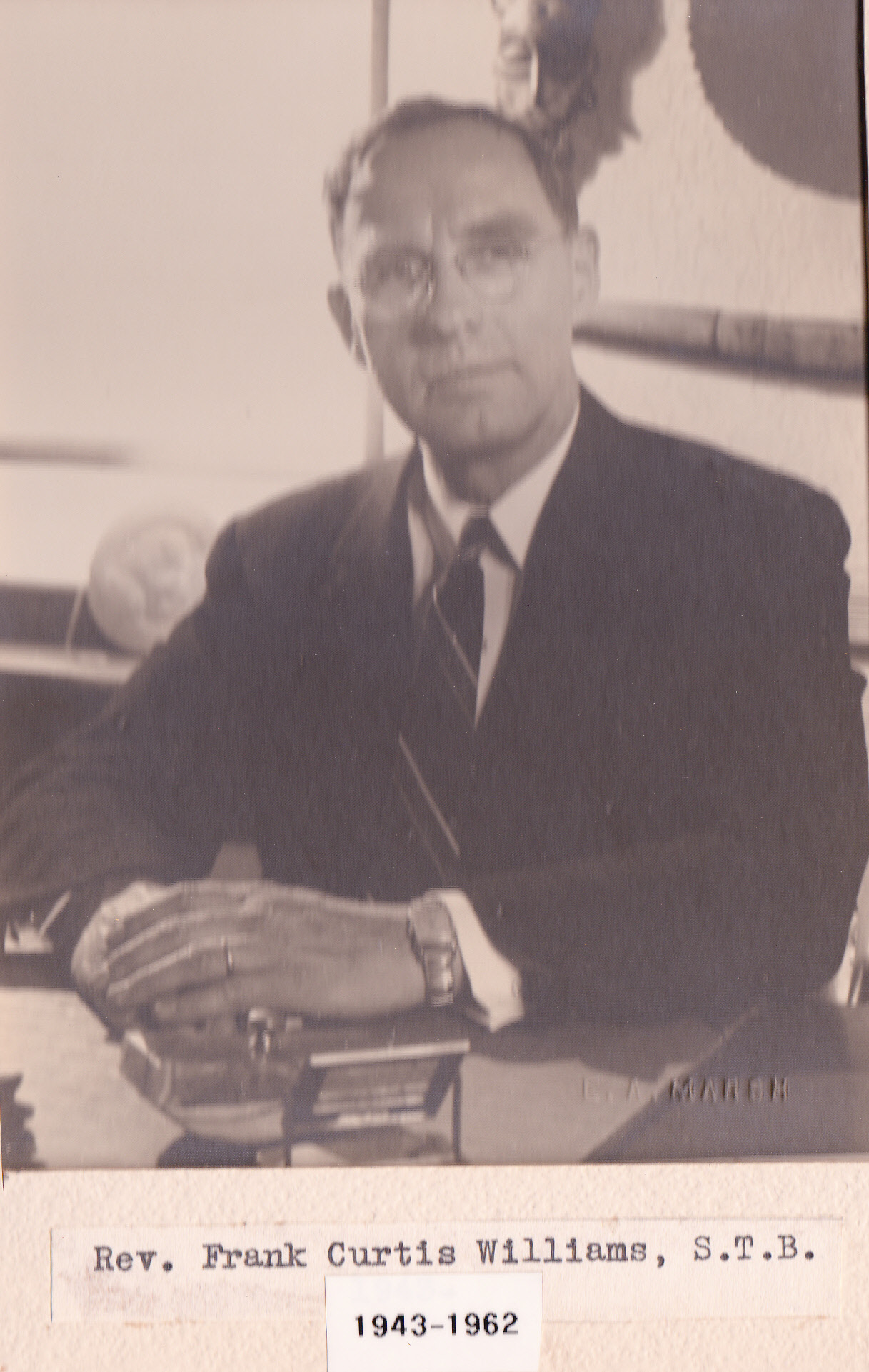

Rev. Frank Curtis Williams was pastor from 1943 until his last service on July 28, 1962. In 1967 Rev. John A. Shope resigned. From January 28, 1968, to June 15. 1969 the Rev. Ronald Maxam was interim pastor. On October 26, 1969, the Rev. H. Lyle Rozeboom was installed.

When the congregation united with Bay Ridge United Presbyterian Church to become Bay Ridge United Church, the Reverend Lyle Rozeboom was the pastor and the Reverend Frank Williams was pastor emeritus. The Reverend Ephraim Felix was the pastor of the Hispanic congregation which was started in 1973.

== Bay Ridge United Presbyterian Church ==
The Bay Ridge United Presbyterian Church (BRUPC) came into existence on July 3, 1907, under the name the "Bay Ridge United (Presbyterian) Church." This early group met each Sunday under the leadership of the Reverend William J Pinkerton, in a house in Bay Ridge, located on 76th Street near Fifth Avenue. (476 76th Street) They remained at this location until May, 1912, when "preaching services" were begun in a store at 6811 Fort Hamilton Parkway which the pastor had rented for $12 a month. After eight months, the church headquarters were again transferred to the 76th Street house due to the difficulty heating the store.

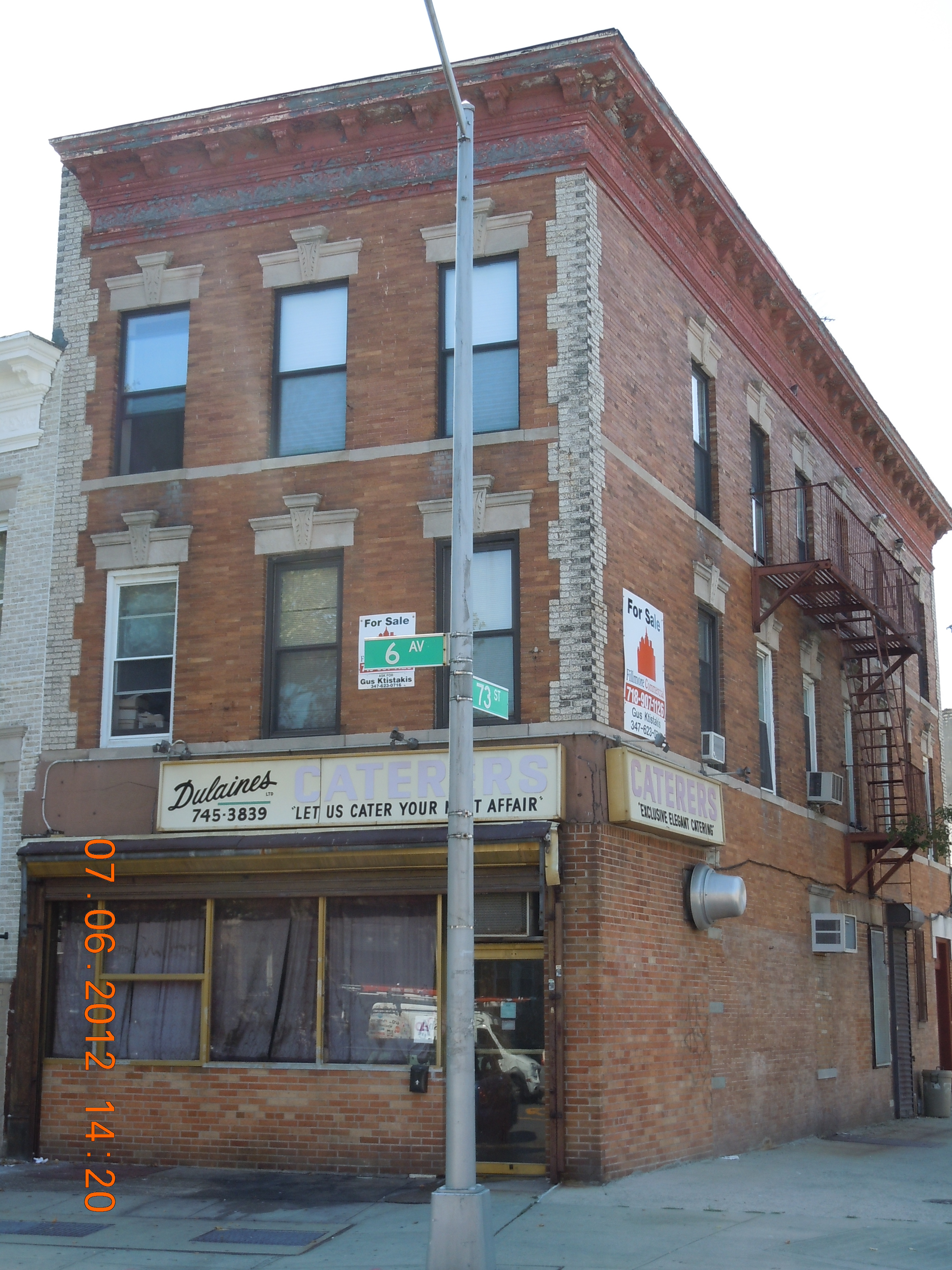
73 St. and 6 Ave Storefront in 2012

Under the pastoral guidance of a new minister, the Rev. J.J. Munro, the church moved in November, 1913 to a store at 7302 Sixth Avenue for $22.50 a month. Rev. Munro was previously chaplain to the Prison Evangelistic Society of New York. At the time there was some controversy as to location, whether the church was in Bay Ridge or South Brooklyn, and it was finally changed to the "South United Presbyterian Church."

Their first major step under Pastor Munro's leadership was the purchase of the $6000 property on 75th Street, 303.68 feet southeast from 6th Avenue, on which to build their own church building. In July, 1914, confident that they were ready to begin construction, the church trustees obtained a loan from the United Presbyterian's Church Extension at Pittsburgh.

The cornerstone was laid at a ceremony on Saturday April 17, 1915. The work progressed so that by July 8, 1915, the building was ready for the first Sunday morning worship service. However, it was not until October 17, 1915, that the building was officially dedicated. Even then the ambition of the members was not fully satisfied. They set forth to increase church membership. In 1918 there were 80 members with 250 in the Sunday School. $2,699 was raised and the property was worth $15,000. Pastor Munro continued working for the growth of the church until he answered another call in 1920.

His successor, J.L. McCreight, continued his fine work. McCreight, however, was a trained educator, and within a year he was called to a professorship in a Western Seminary college.

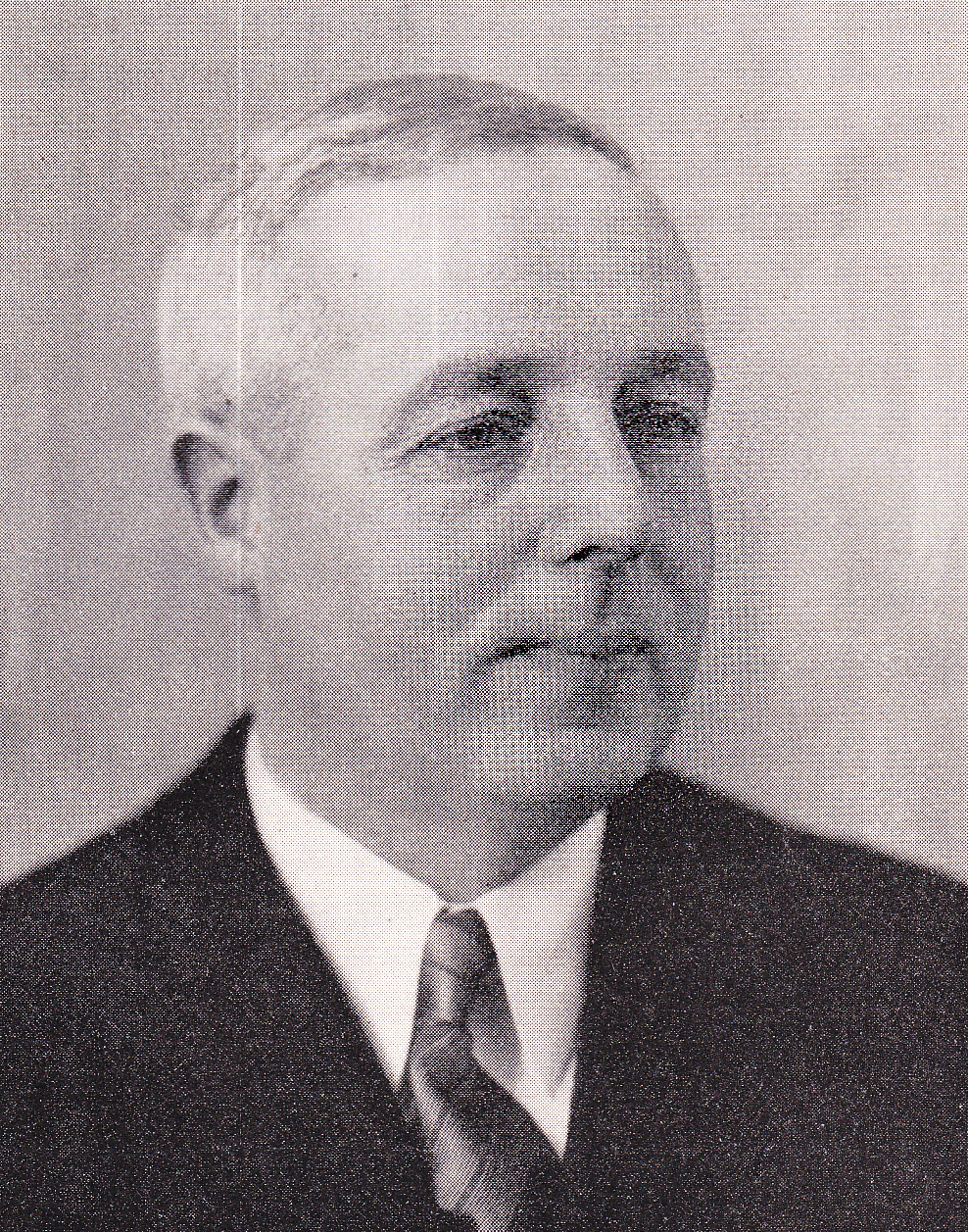
Rev. John H. Egner

From June 1921 to July 1922, the pulpit of the South United Presbyterian Church, as it was then called, was filled by clergymen and divinity students supplied by various church organizations. The search for a new pastor ended, however, when on July 13, 1922, a young seminary student, John H. Egner, was ordained and on the same day installed in the church as its pastor. Like former pastors, Egner worked tirelessly for the improvement of the church and the Sunday school. Aided by the church members, he increased membership to over 400. While Egner was pastor, the church developed from an organization partially supported by the Board of Home Missions of the United Presbyterian Church to a completely self-supporting organization, ably operating on a sound financial basis.

A native of the Netherlands, the Rev. Egner came to this country at age 23 years. During World War I, he served with the U.S. Engineers, and after the Armistice, attended the Biblical Seminary in New York. In October 1921, as senior student in the department of theology, he supplied the pulpit of the Bay Ridge Church and upon graduation from the Biblical Seminary in the spring of 1922 was ordained and installed as pastor of the church.

When Egner took charge of the church in 1922, there was a membership of about 40. Under his leadership the church began to grow and in 1932 it had a membership of 325. During those ten years the Sunday school experienced a rapid growth. When Egner came to the church, there were little more than a handful enrolled. In 1932 the enrollment was 300. There also was an active Young People's Organization and a women's society which has loyally supported the pastor in his work in behalf of the church. In 1932, Special Services marked the 10th anniversary of Rev. John H. Egner's pastorate.

The church, which in its early days had a hard struggle to exist, became self-supporting for many years and was cleared of debt in 1927.

Egner was married in June 1931 to Patience M. Love of Thompsonville, Connecticut. Mrs. Egner was a graduate nurse of the Springfield, Massachusetts Hospital. For seven years she was a nurse in the Springfield schools and for two years served as school nurse for the Thompsonville and Enfield Schools.

Under the leadership of Reverend Egner, the congregation changed its name in 1925 to the Bay Ridge United Presbyterian Church. There was more building in 1935 when the congregation voted to make a two-story extension at the back of the church.

Dedication Services were held on Sunday, October 3, 1937, for the dedication of church windows at the morning service at 11:00 am and a special dedication of the Masonic Window, presented by Free Masons of the Church, 1937 at the evening at 8:00 pm. Speakers were the Right Worshipful Raymond C. Ellis and Most Worshipful Jacob C. Clinck, Grand Master of Masons in the State of New York.

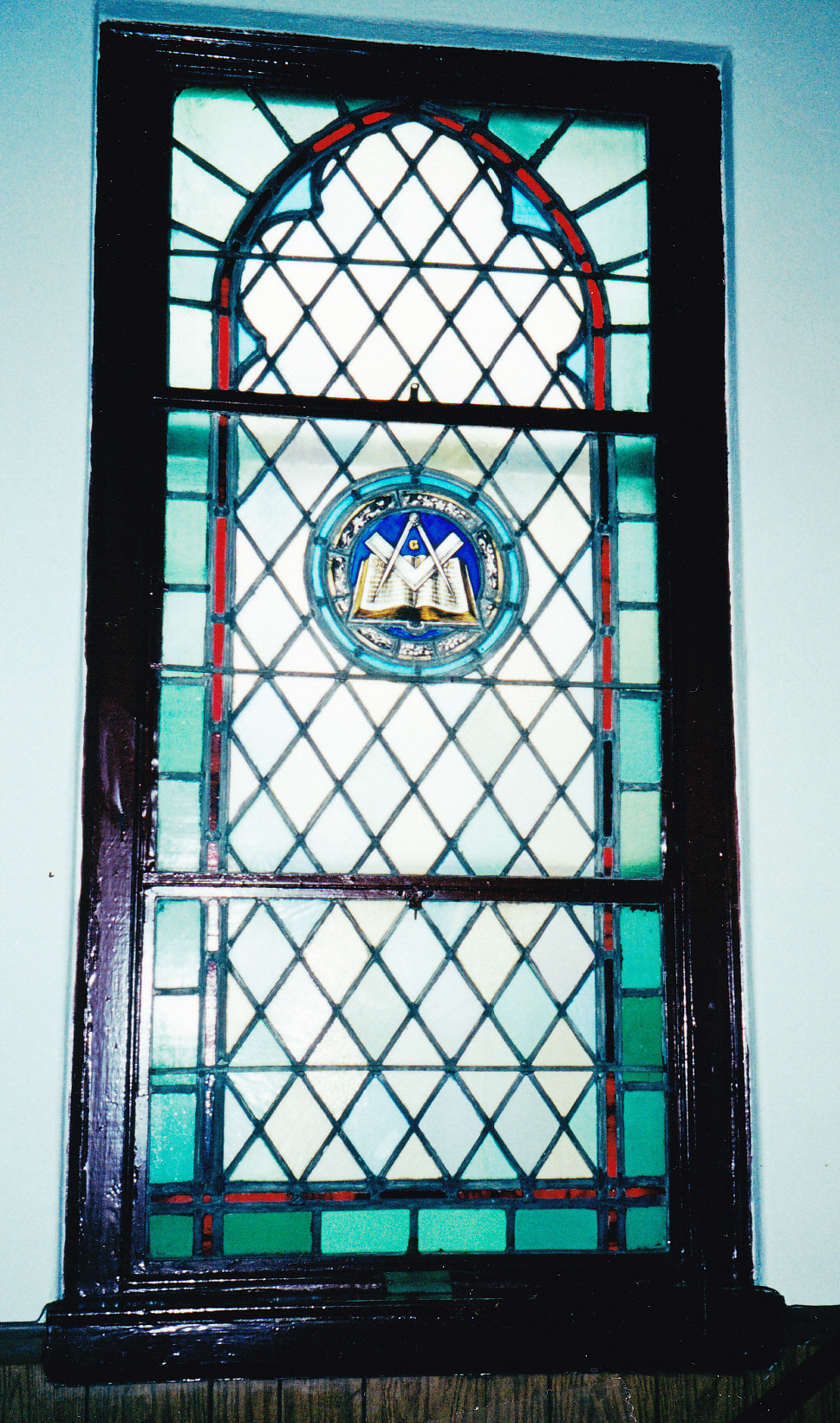
BRUPC Masonic Window

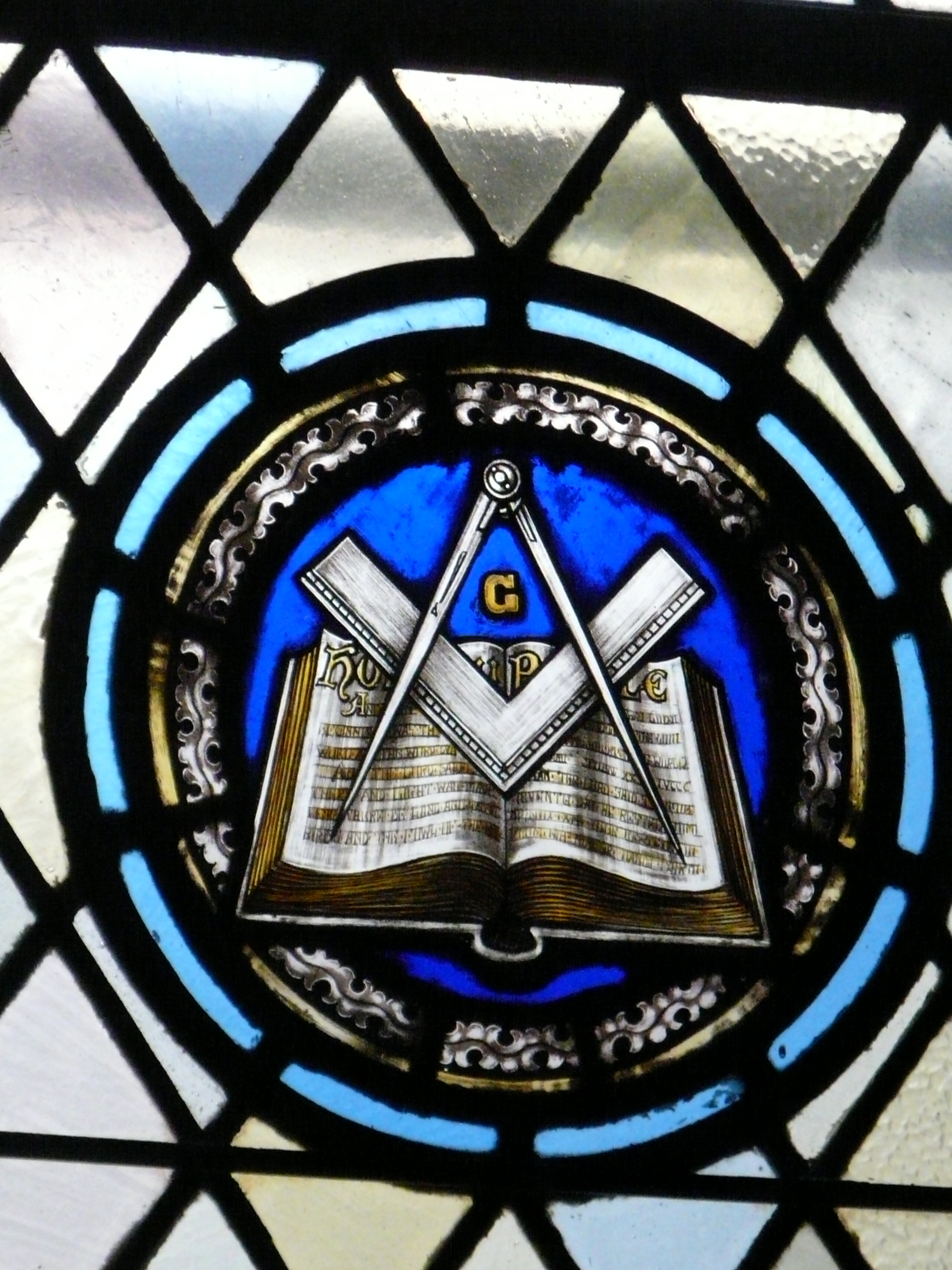
Masonic symbol from BRUPC Window

The candle window "He that followeth me shall not walk in darkness" is a memorial to John Stuart, David Bruce Stuart, and Mrs. Thomas Roden. John and David were the children of Gertrude Littlejohn Roden and her husband Walter Roden. They died as infants. Mrs. Thomas Roden was the mother of Walter.

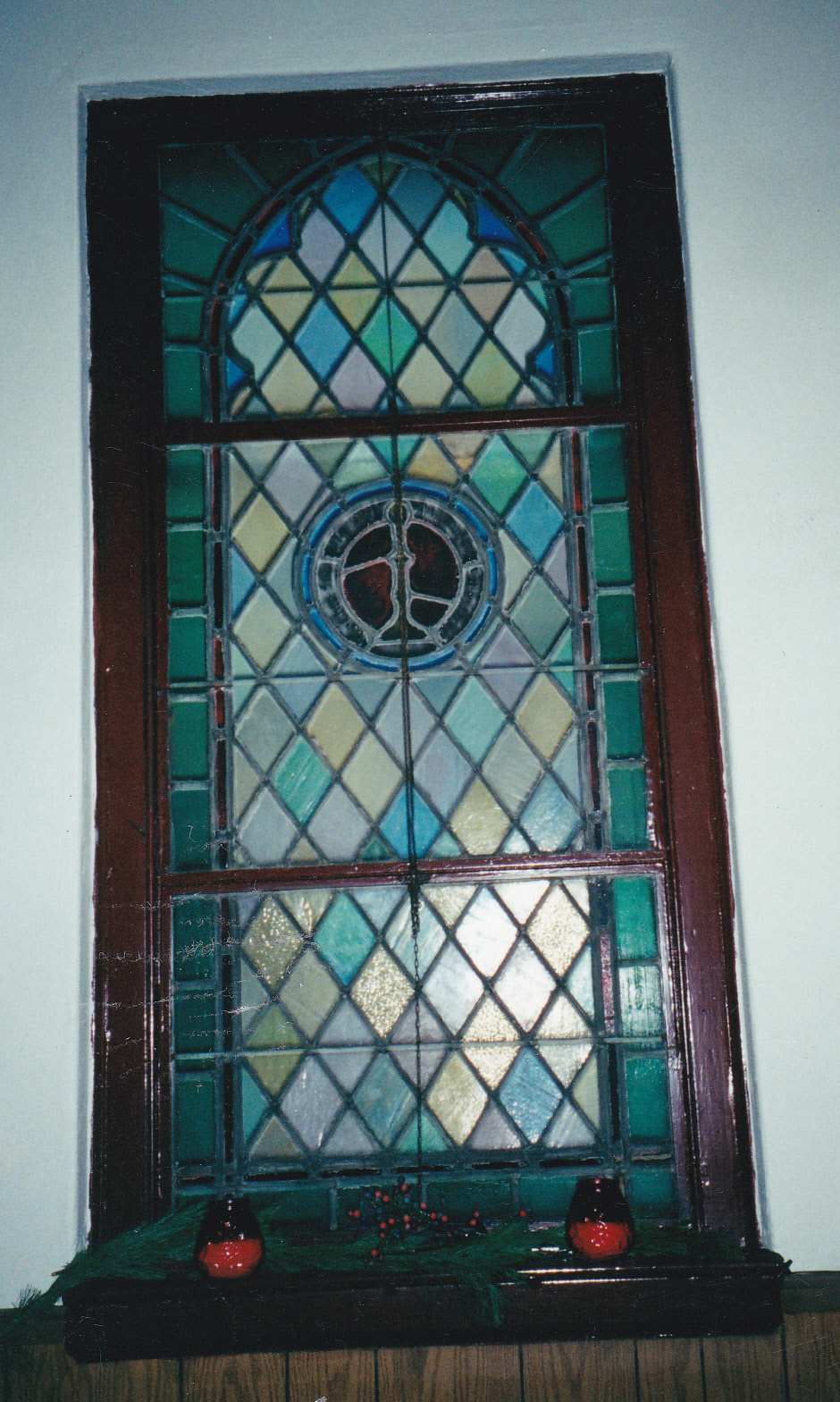
BRUPC Candle Window in Loving Memory of Mrs. Thomas, John Stuart and David Bruce Roden

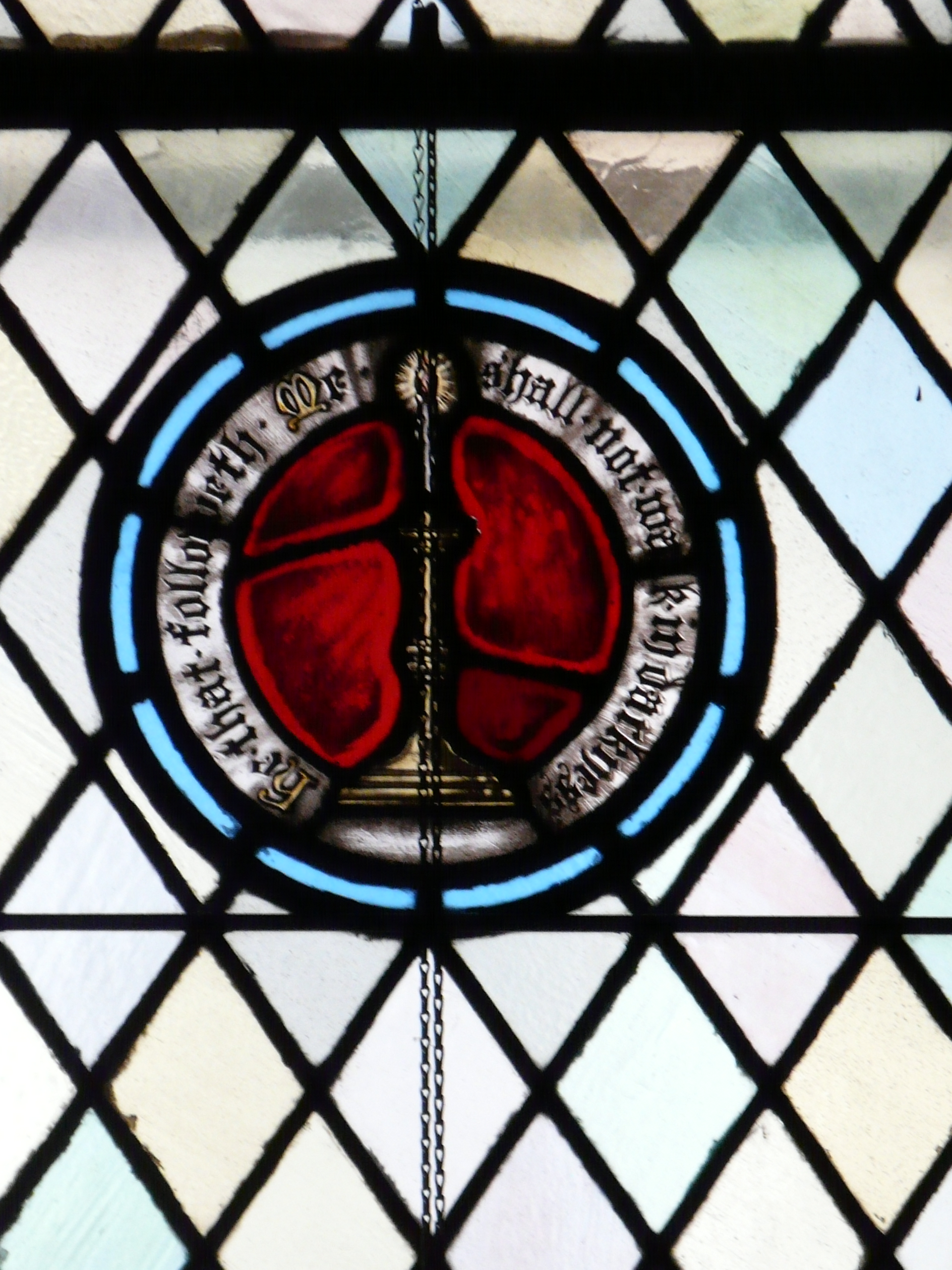
Candle from BRUPC Candle Window

On May 31, 1939, a parsonage was purchased. Finally, because of Reverend Egner's energy and efforts, the membership of the congregation reached 400.

Pastor Egner resigned on April 5, 1944, to accept a call to the Presbyterian Church in Delancy, New York. His last Sunday was May 7.

In February 1941, the church began Wednesday "released time" classes which were allowed by the Coudert-McLaughlin Law passed in Albany. A great deal more besides "released time" classes went on. There was a vibrant Boy Scout troop, a Brownie and Girl Scout troop and a basketball team of young men who competed with other area church teams. There was also a junior high youth group and a very vital senior high group.

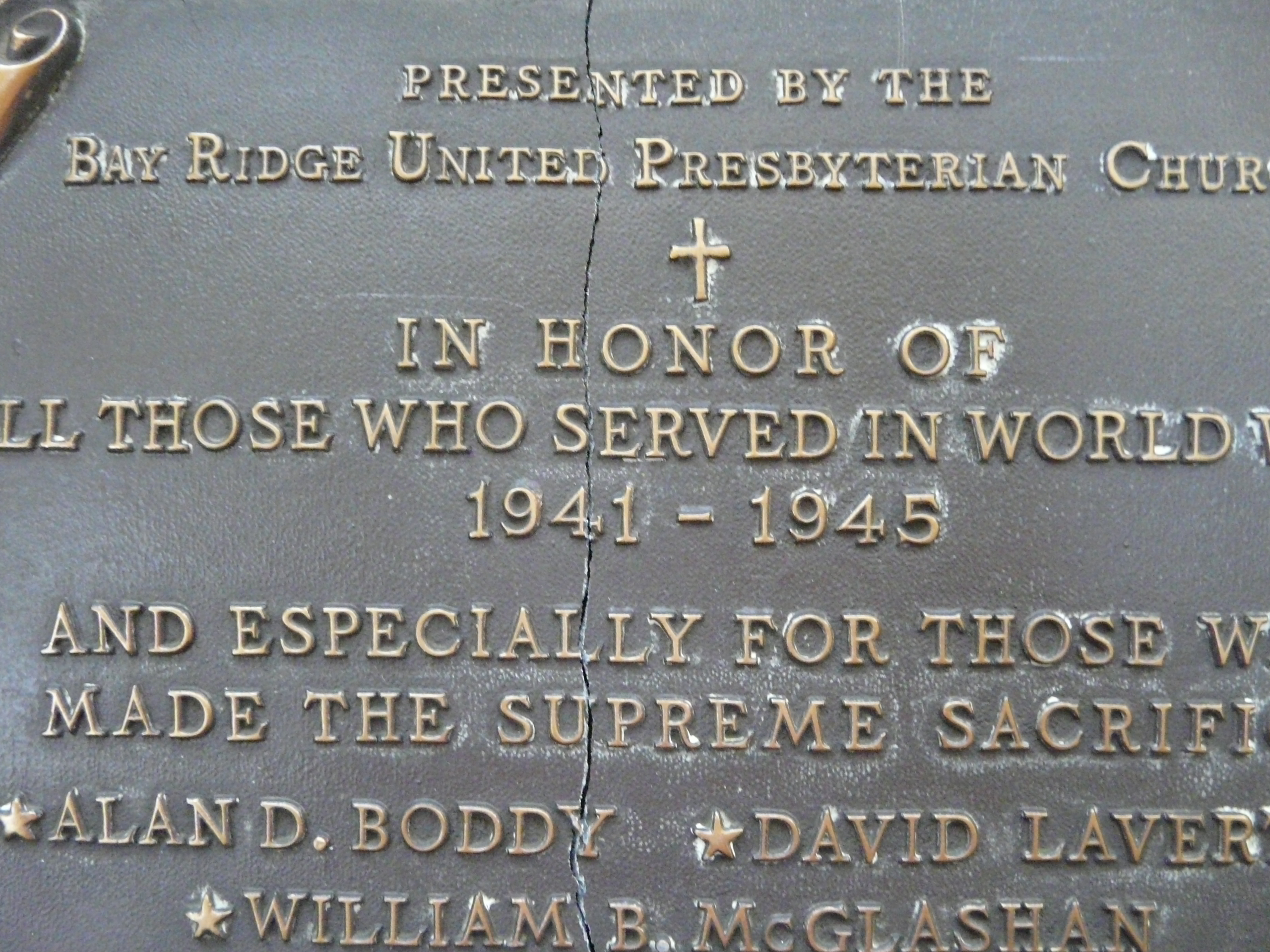
BRUPC Plaque for Boddy, Laverty & McGlashan, donated to the National World War II Museum in New Orleans, Louisiana

Rev. Wistor R. Smith served as pastor from January 11, 1945, to December 31, 1945.

Rev. Norman Webster served from April 4, 1946, until he was called to Waterloo, Iowa on October 21, 1950. During his time there was great spiritual growth with three young men entering the ministry: Edwin (Scotty) Prophet, John Geldmacher and Neil M. Stevenson. Rev. Stevenson became a Navy Chaplain in the United States Navy Chaplain Corps and rose to the rank of Rear Admiral.

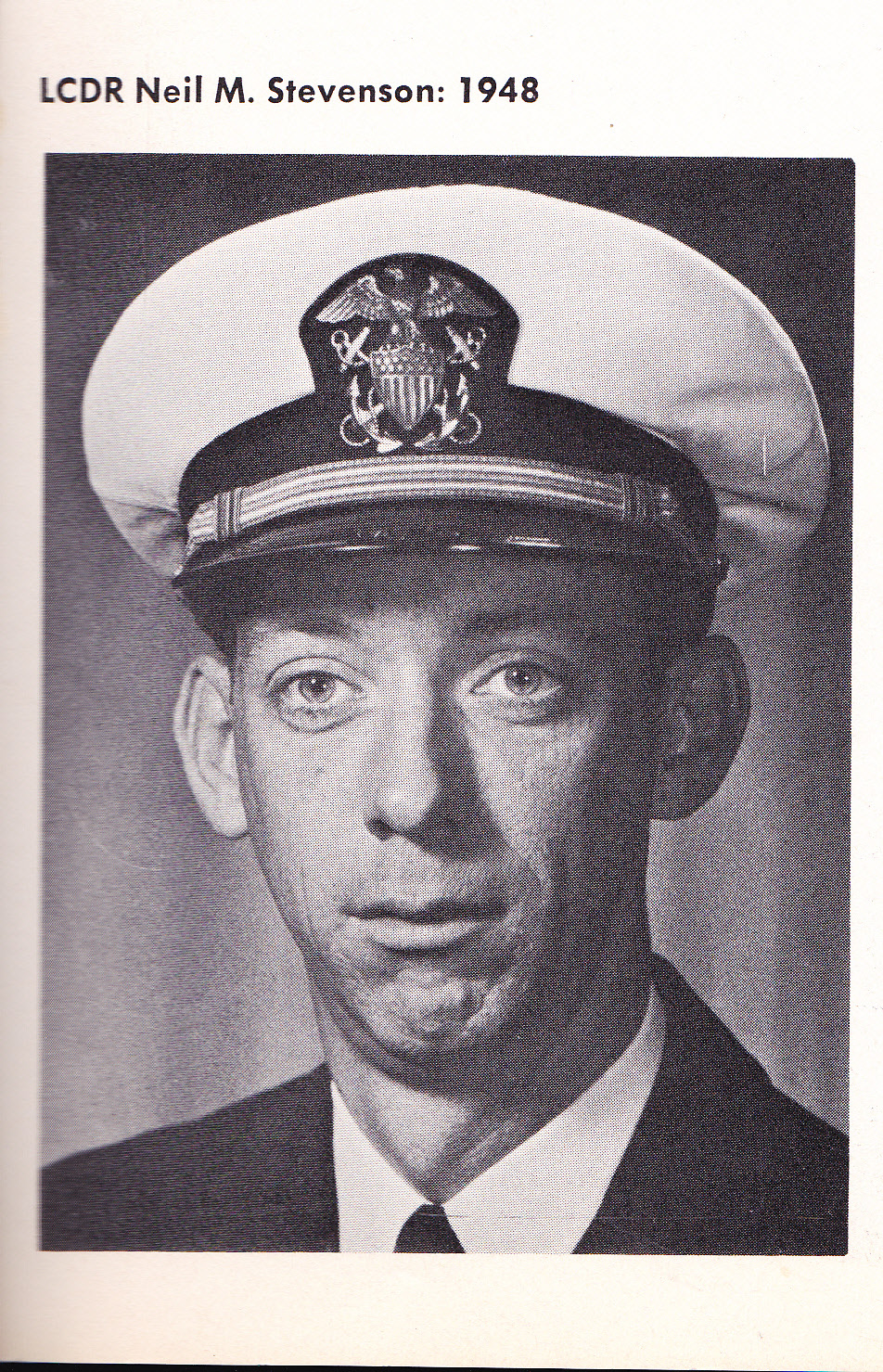
1948 US Navy Photo of LCDR Neil M. Stevenson from Fort Hamilton H.S. Tower 1963 Yearbook

On Thursday evening, February 15, 1951, Robert I. Scott was installed as minister by the New York Presbytery. Rev. Scott served until called to Greenport, New York on June 30, 1963. He died on August 22, 1964, after a long illness. He was 48.

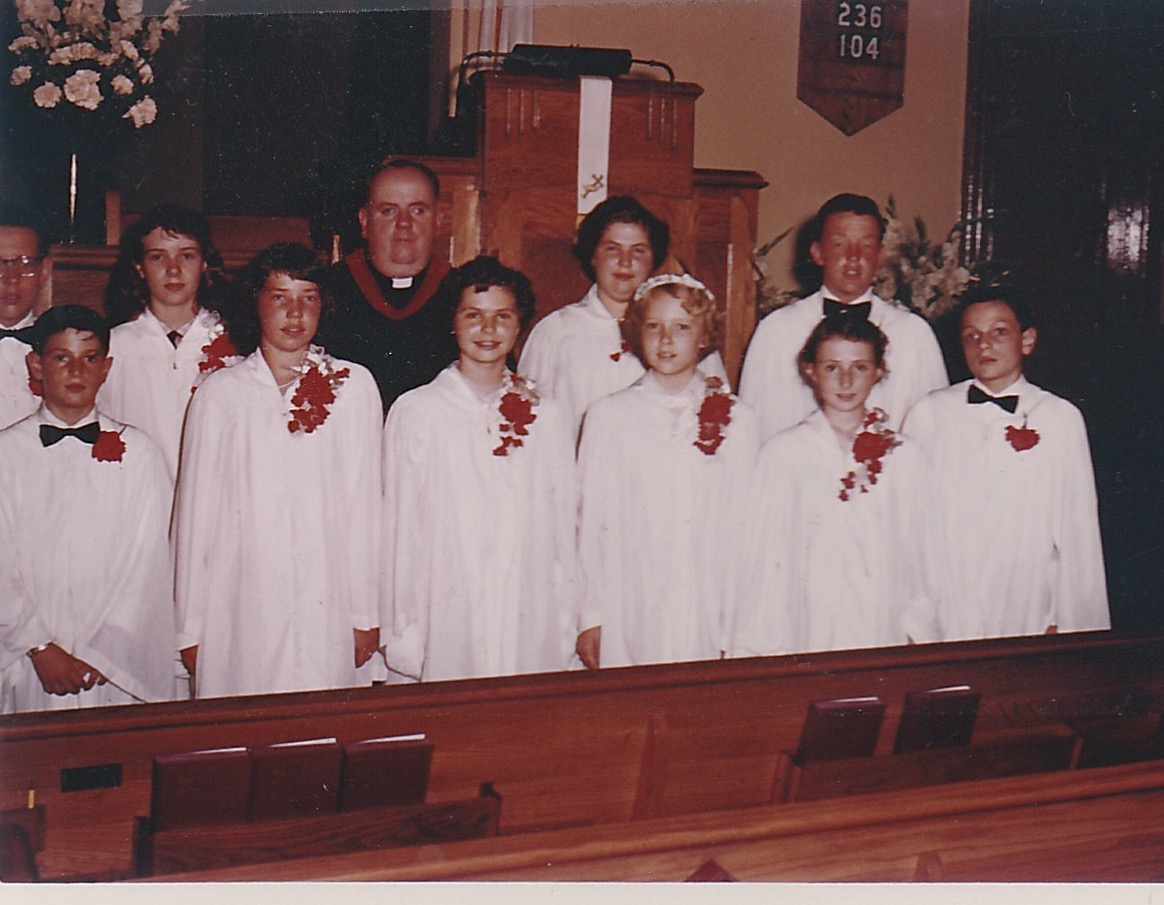
Rev. Robert Scott and Confirmation Class in 1956

Rev. Ralph H. Reed was stated supply from September 1, 1963, to February 29, 1964. Rev. Jack Burback was pastor from April 12, 1964, to September 14, 1965. Rev. S. Bruce Wagner was stated supply from September 6, 1965, to October 30, 1966. Rev. Jeffrey C. Wood was pastor from November 20, 1966, to August 31, 1973. He was married to Margaret Ann Lloyd on December 31, 1967. Rev. Donald Scott was stated supply from November 1973 to September 1974.

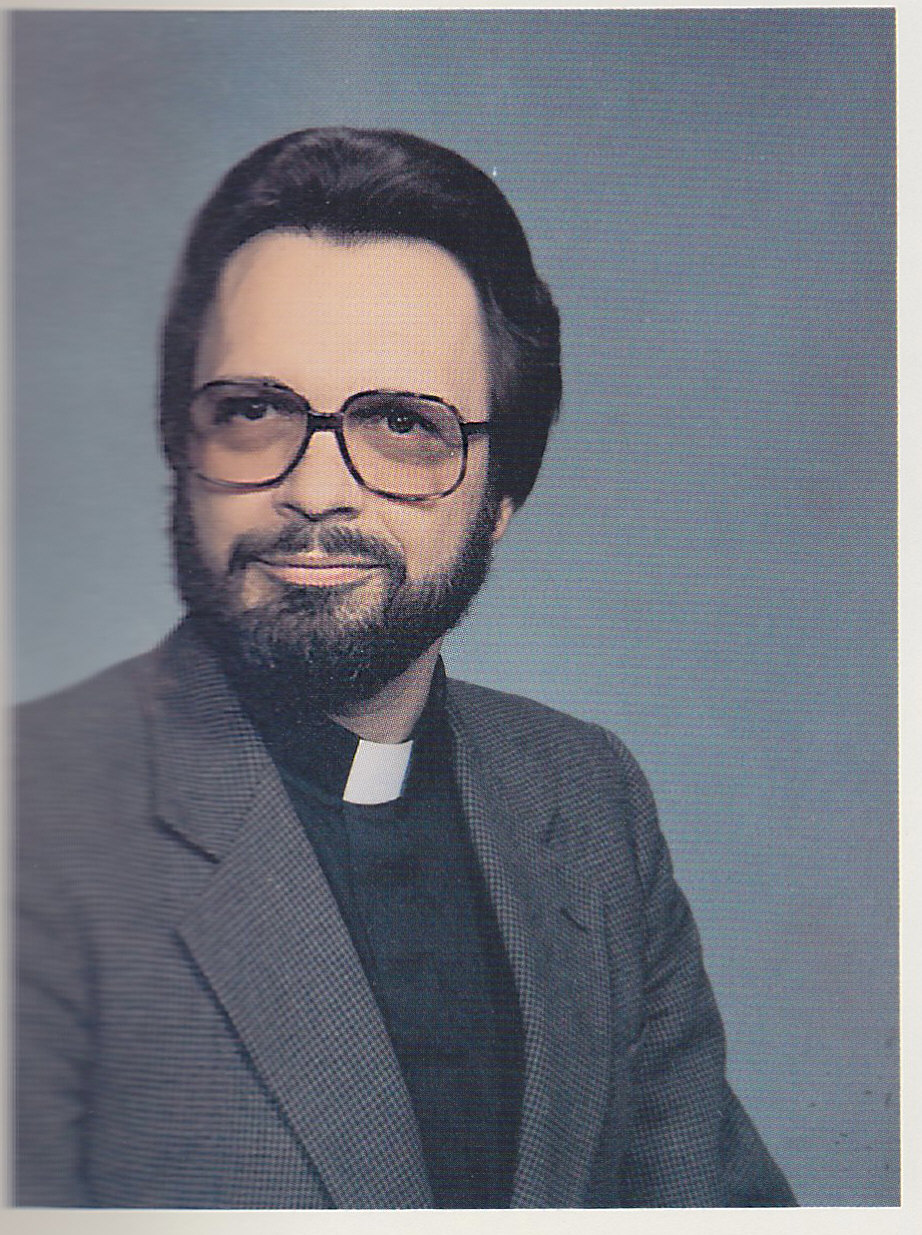
Rev. Lyle Rozeboom

The Bay Ridge United Church was formed by a merger of the South Reformed Church and the Bay Ridge United Presbyterian Church in 1976. At that time, the Reverend Lyle Rozeboom was pastor of the South Reformed Church, and Bay Ridge United Presbyterian Church was without a minister. Pastor Rozeboom was called to serve as pastor of the combined congregations and the name became Bay Ridge United Church. For its first decade of existence, Lyle Rozeboom led the new united congregation.

In 1985, Pastor Rozeboom resigned to take a pastorate in upstate New York. After an interim pastorate by William Hoffman, Pastor Howard Ashley arrived in 1986.

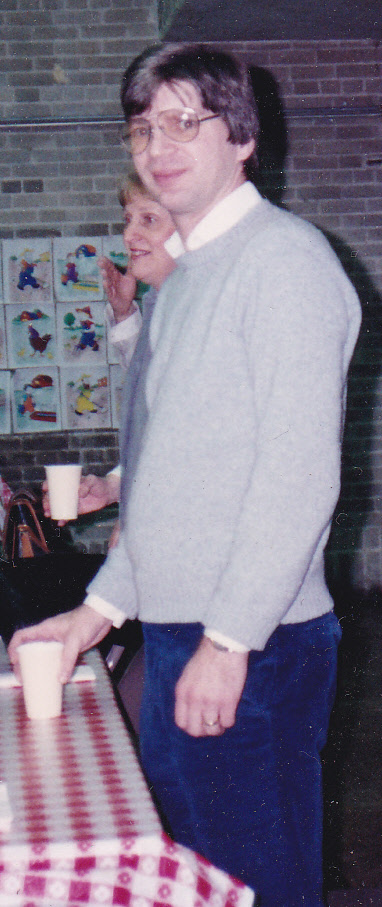
Rev Howard Ashley at Square Dance

In 1991, during Pastor Ashley's ministry, the facade on the front of the church was rebuilt. This helped the church stand out from the rest of the buildings around it on Bay Ridge Parkway.

Pastor Ashley resigned in 1994 to take a pastorate on the west coast. After Pastor Ashley's resignation, Bay Ridge United Church was served by three interim pastors. The Reverend Susan Huizenga served from September 1994 and left in May 1995 to be married. The Reverend Dr. Richard W. Smith came in August 1995 and served as interim pastor until August 1996 when his wife accepted a teaching position in Chicago. The Reverend Calvin Spann was ordained on November 10, 1996, and became the contract pastor on December 1, 1996, and left in April 1998. The Reverend Boyd Lowry became interim pastor on September 1, 1998, and retired on June 30, 1999.

The Reverend Ann Akers served as Interim Pastor from September 15, 1999, until May 31, 2000. The Reverend Christine Dyke was called and approved at a Congregational Meeting in April, 2000. She became pastor on June 1 and was installed in October. Reverend Dyke's ministry was characterized by change as she sought to grow the membership. The longtime choir director left in 2003 and Reverend Dyke resigned in December 2003.

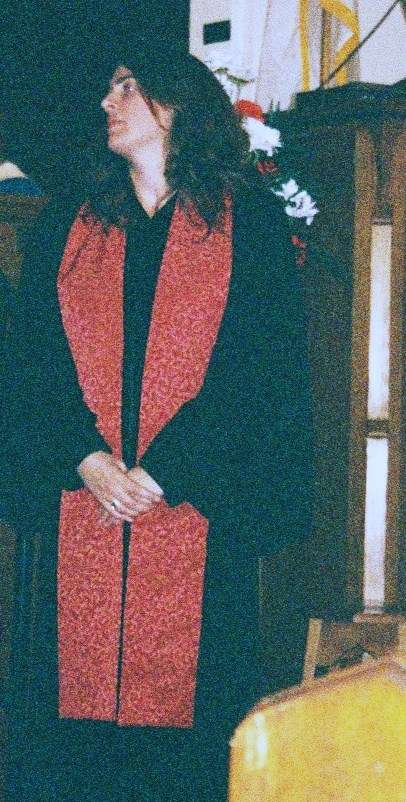
Rev. Christine Dyke

Reverend Spann again served as contractpPastor from January until June 2004 with Pulpit Supply serving until May 2005.

The Reverend Jane Donnelly was approved at a congregational meeting on March 20, 2005. She became pastor on May 15, when she was ordained and installed.

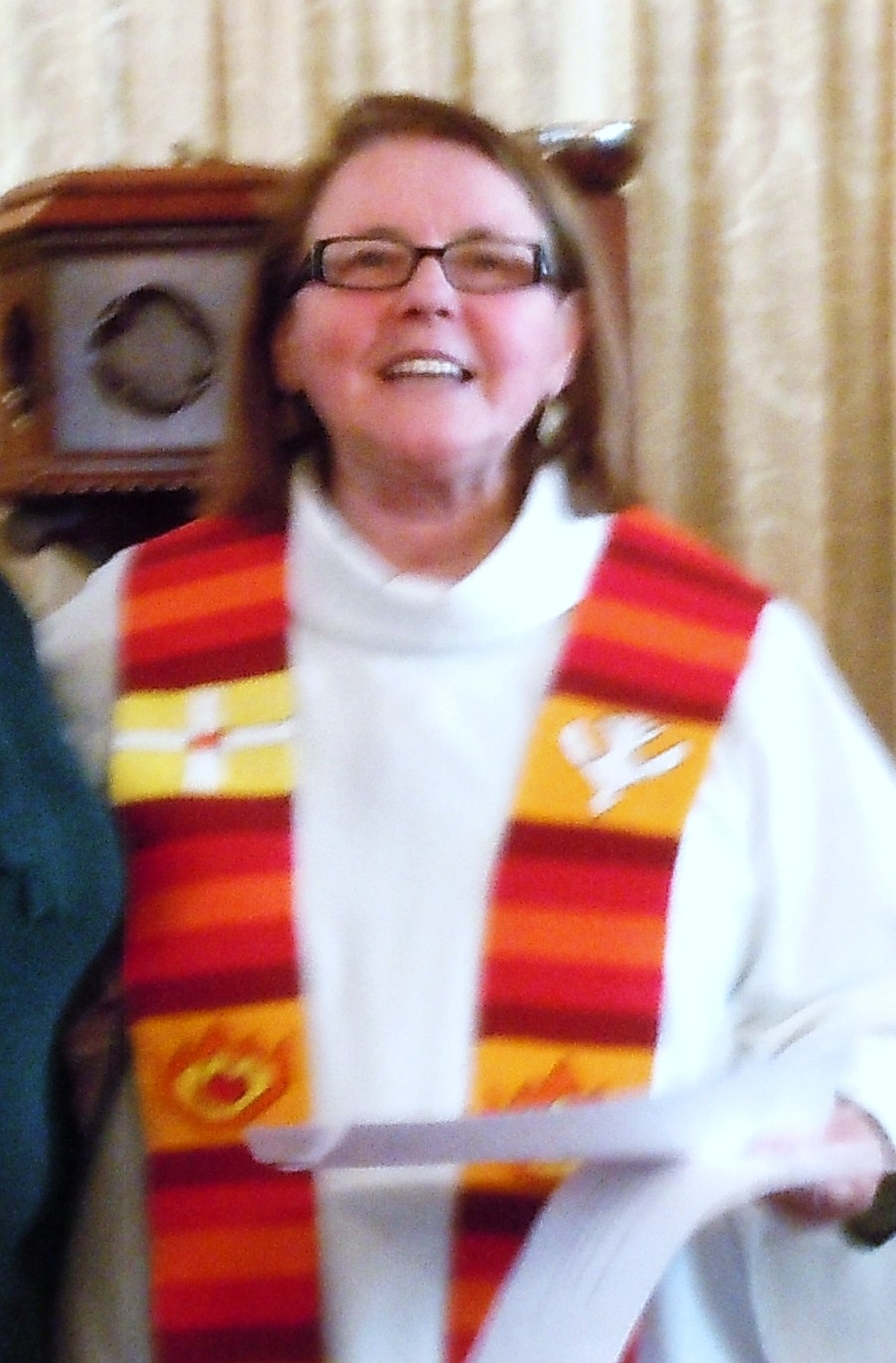
Rev. Jane Donnelly

In 2011, with the passing of an active member, Jim Gillies, Bay Ridge United voted to add the memorial donations received in his memory to their scholarship fund and designate it in his memory. The Jim Gillies Scholarship Fund is managed by the Sunday School and gives awards to deserving students.

Jim Gillies, who had been battling multiple myeloma, died on the morning of September 25, 2011, at Lutheran Medical Center where he succumbed to an infection. Jim was born on February 25, 1943, and was baptized by Rev. Egner and confirmed at the church. He was active in the church's Cub and Boy Scout troops and attended P.S. 127, McKinley J.H.S. and Fort Hamilton High School (Class of 1960) and Long Island University. He worked in brokerage houses, retiring from Lehman Brothers. He was a dedicated elder, providing hospitality in the narthex every Sunday with his buddy Frank McCarthy, counting the offering, and participating in worship and all church functions. He was always ready to help and be of service in any way possible. All enjoyed Jim's warmth, his sense of humor and his easygoing style. On October 30, 2011, the church held a memorial service honoring Jim's Scottish heritage. Plaid ribbons were tied everywhere around the church where Jim's influence was felt. Jim was truly a pillar of the church. He did his part. He wore many hats and was fully engaged with the church at every level.

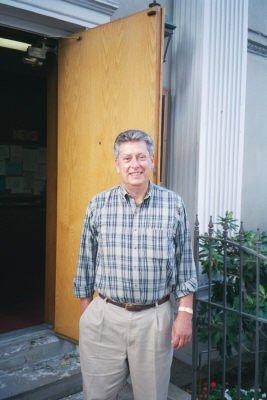
Jim Gillies in front of Bay Ridge United Church

Due to dwindling membership, similar to all the churches in the neighborhood, in 2001 the Manse was sold to establish an endowment fund.

With the continued loss of members and the death of certain key ones, the congregation voted in 2014 to integrate with Fourth Avenue Presbyterian Church, located nearby on Fourth Avenue between Senator and 68th Streets. To assist the congregation the Classis of Brooklyn superseded the Board and appointed a Supersession Committee. Similarly the Presbytery of New York City appointed an Administrative Commission. In accordance with the wishes of the congregation, the board granted permission to sell the building to Iglesia Cristiana Fuente de Luz. Most members moved to Fourth Avenue and joined January 24, 2016. The sale of the building closed on May 6. 2016.

The records of the precedent churches were sent to their respective archives; the South Reformed to the Reformed Church in America (RCA) in New Brunswick, New Jersey and the Bay Ridge United Presbyterian to the Presbyterian Church (USA) (PCUSA) in Philadelphia, Pennsylvania. The records of the Bay Ridge United Church were sent to the PCUSA archive.

The Bay Ridge United Church, a New York State Religious Corporation was dissolved at a Special Term Part 72 of the Supreme Court of the State of New York held in and For the County of Kings at 360 Adams Street, Brooklyn, New York, on the 24th day of March, 2017 (Order of Dissolution Index No. 5902/16.)

=== Gallery ===
The Bay Ridge United Church building contained many memorial items from the former Bay Ridge United Presbyterian Church. They included:

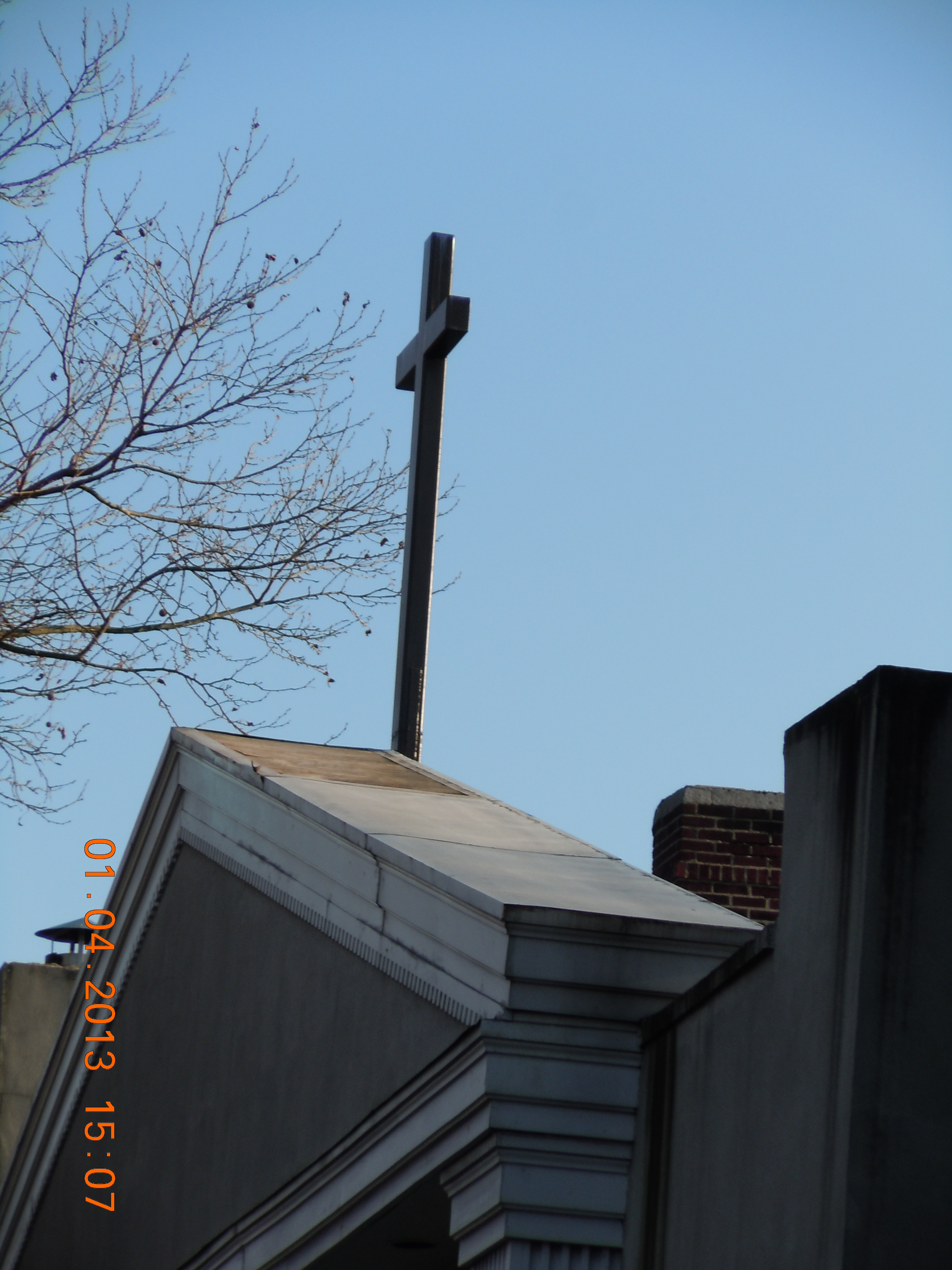
BRUC Cross in memory of Margaret Gillles Jan 2013

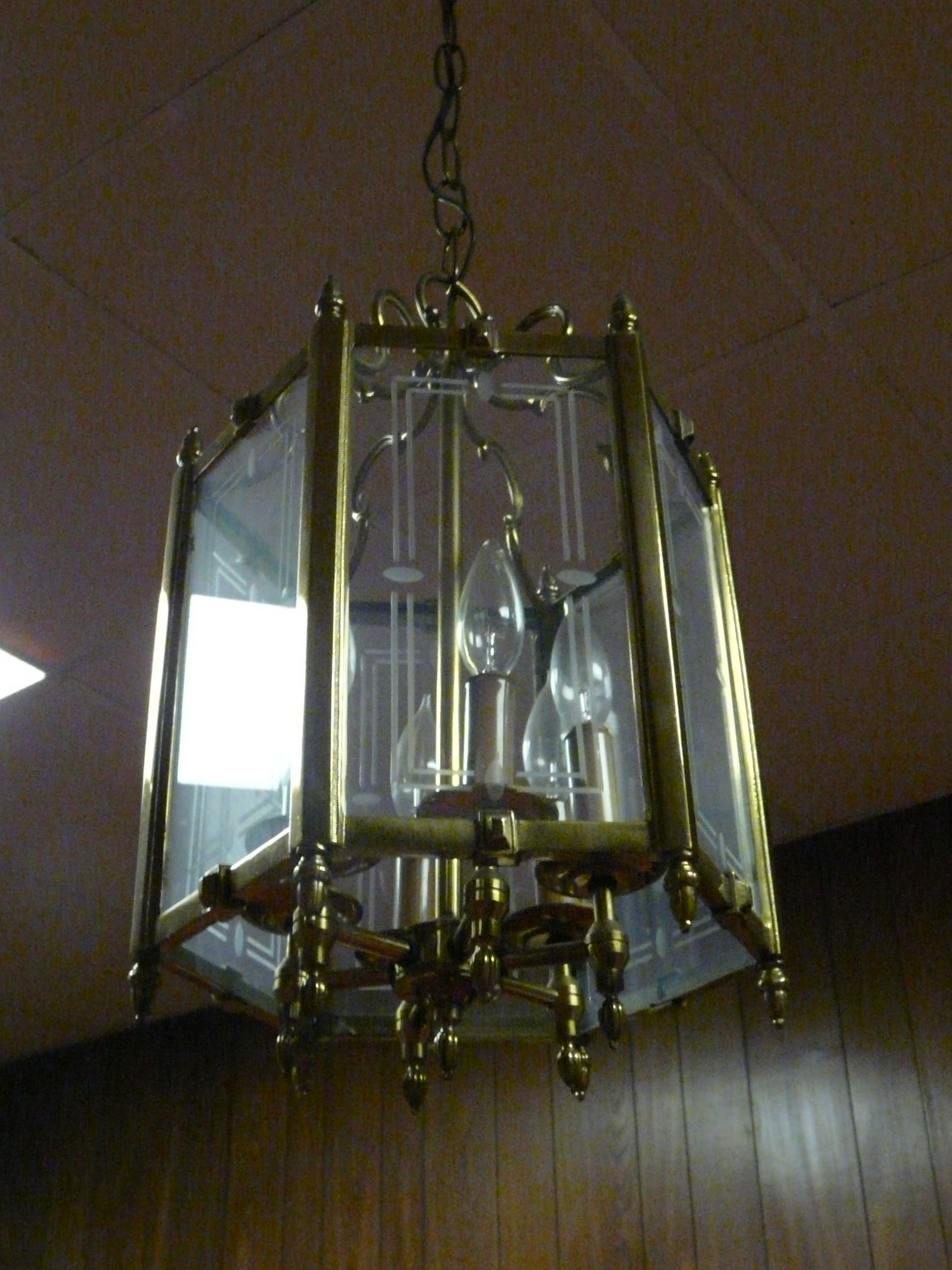
BRUPC Narthex Light in memory of Jean Strange

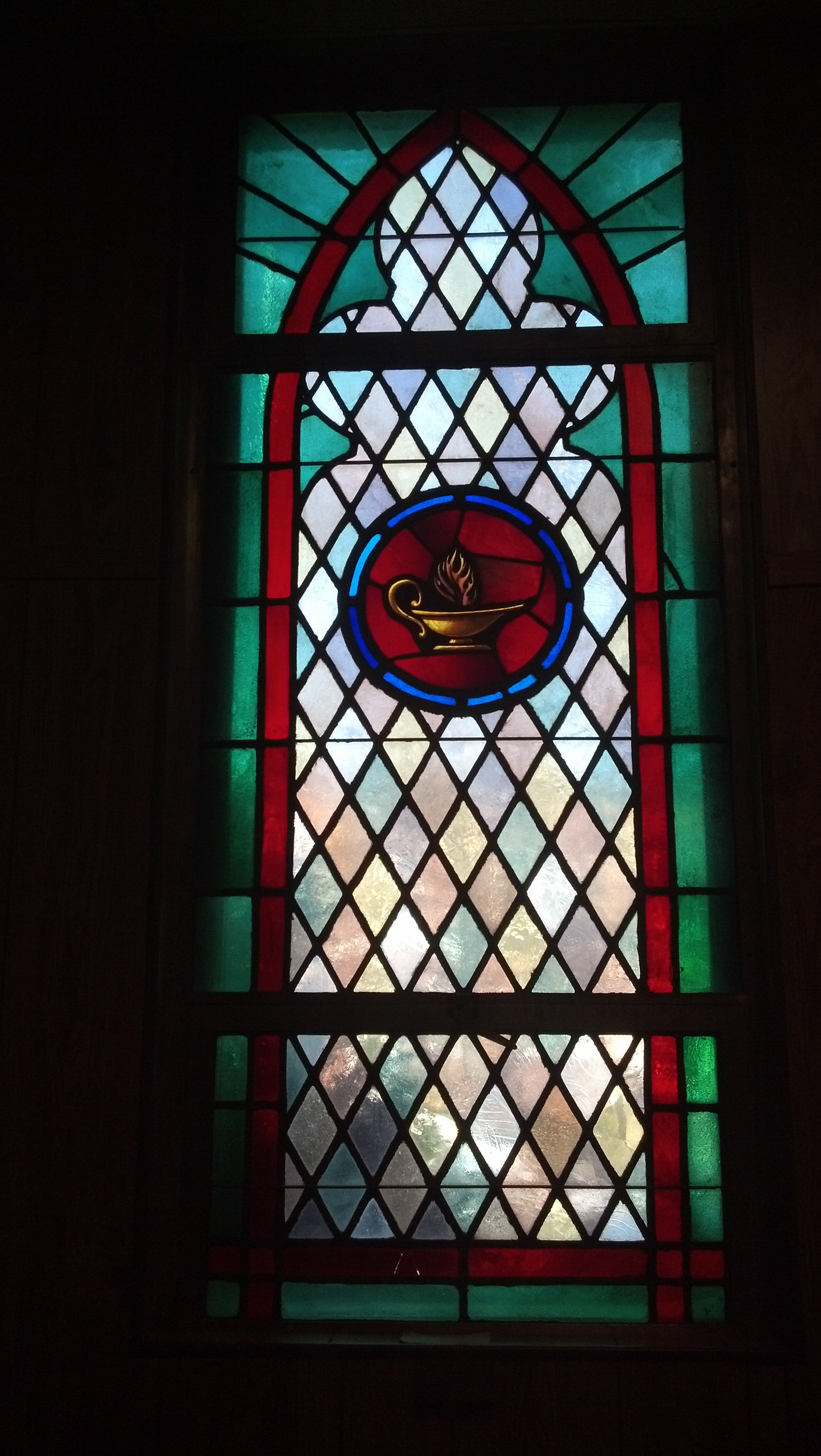
BRUPC Lamp Window in memory of Friends and Loved Ones May 1958 - May 1963

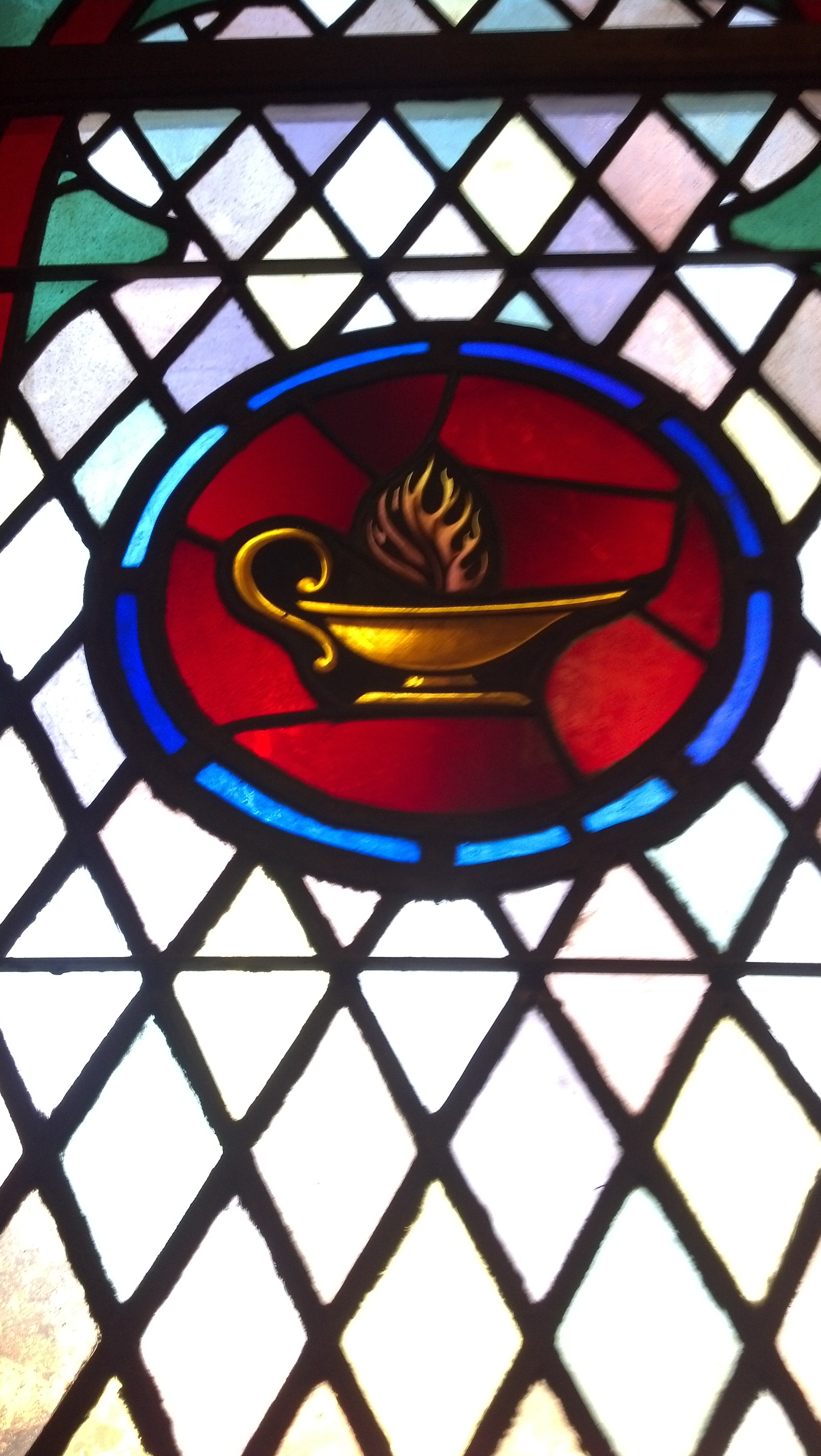
BRUPC Lamp

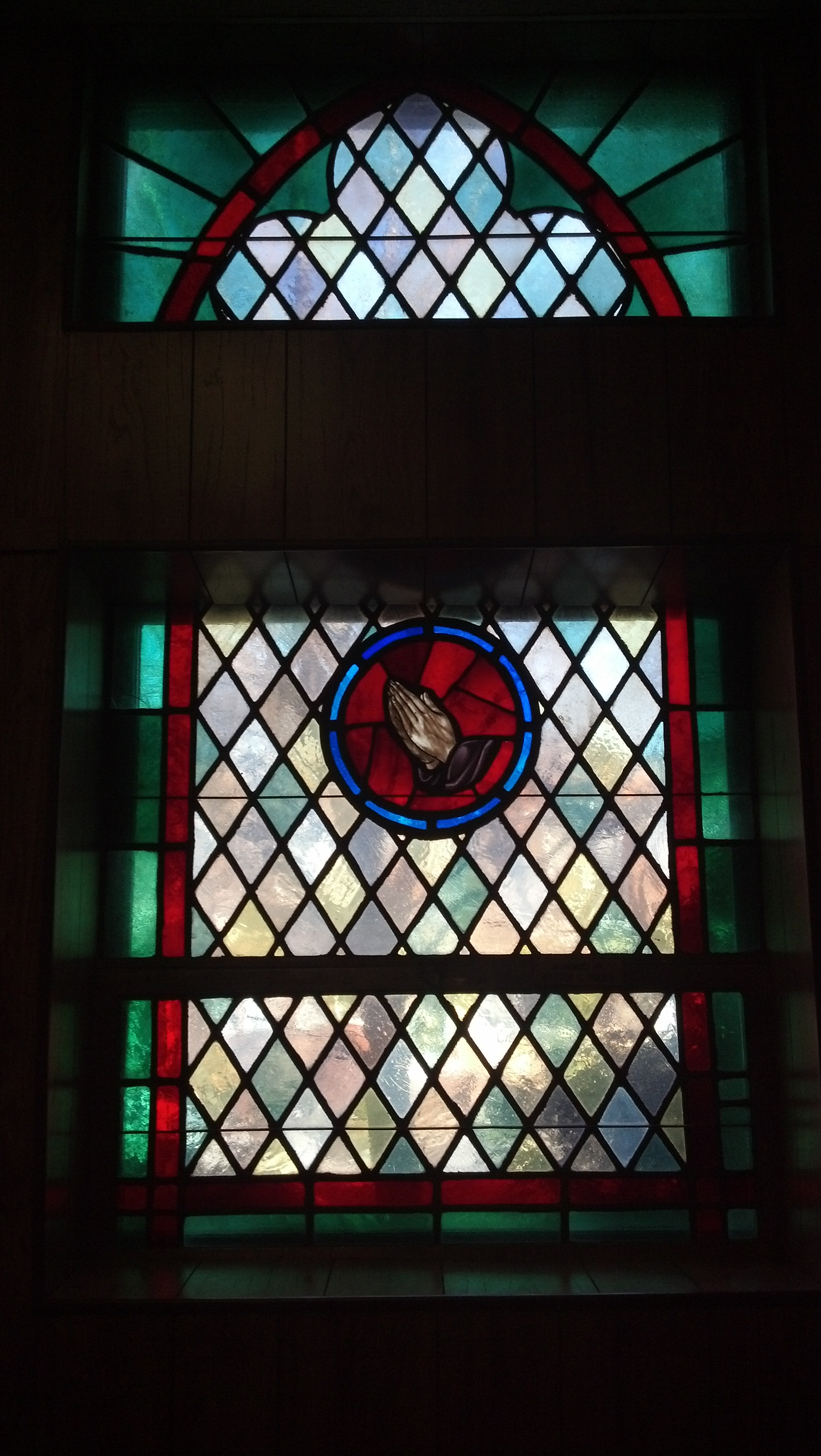
BRUPC Praying Hands Window in memory of Walter G. Roden

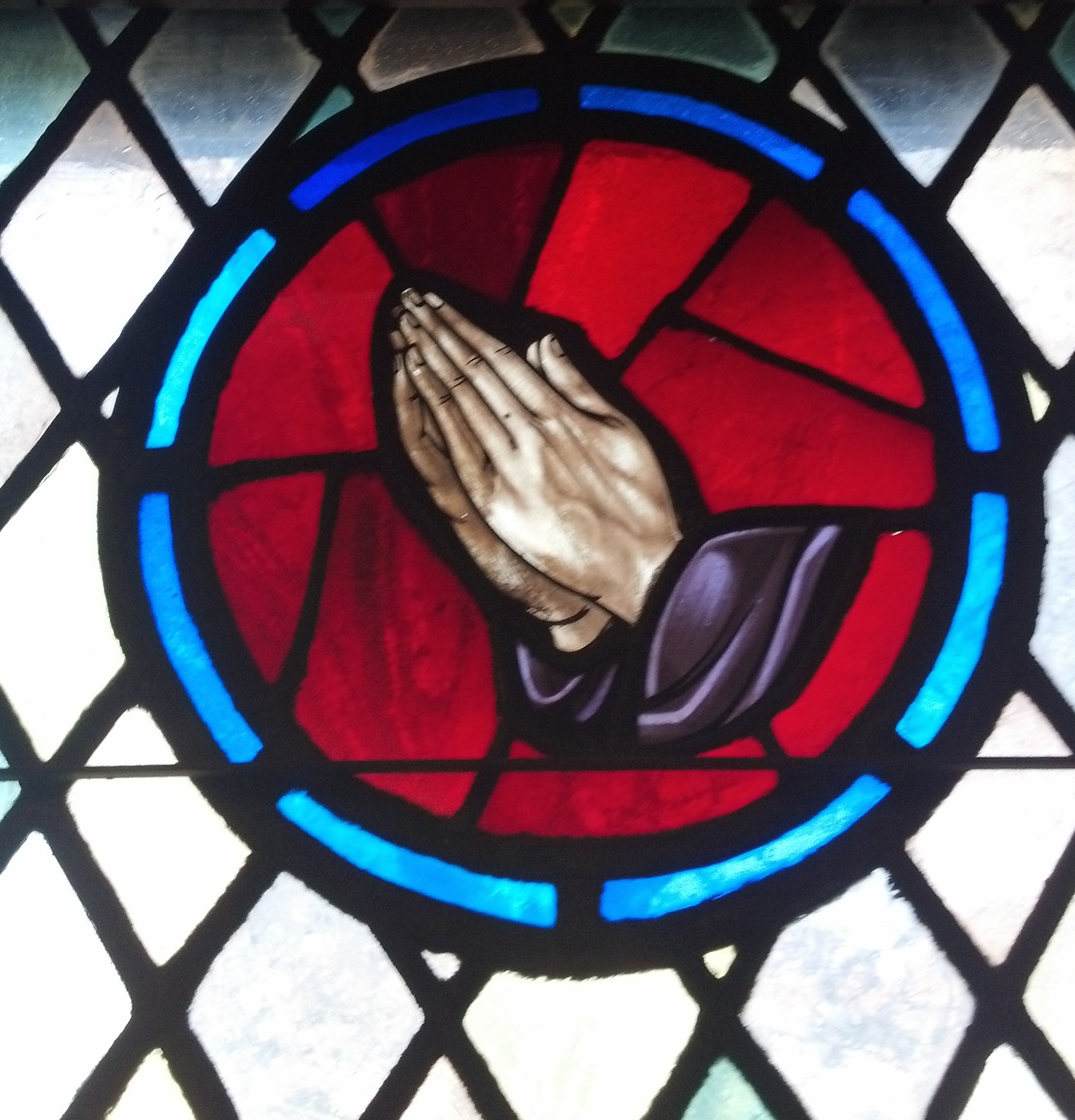
BRUPC Praying hands

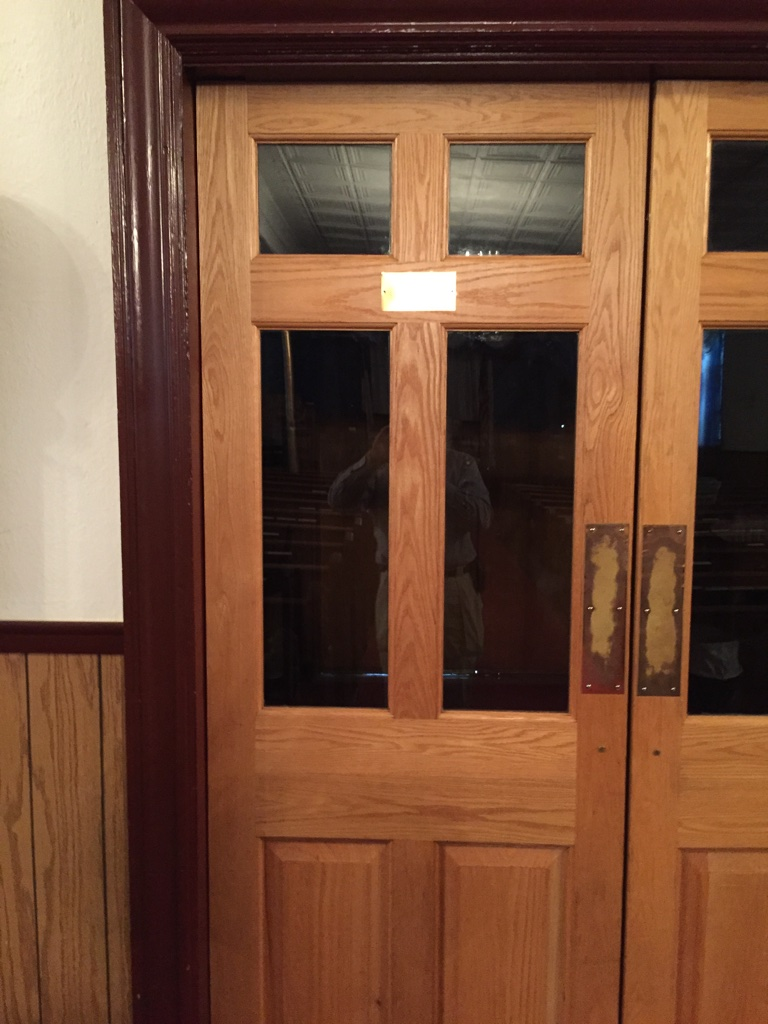
Left Sanctuary Door in memory of Mildred Neilsen

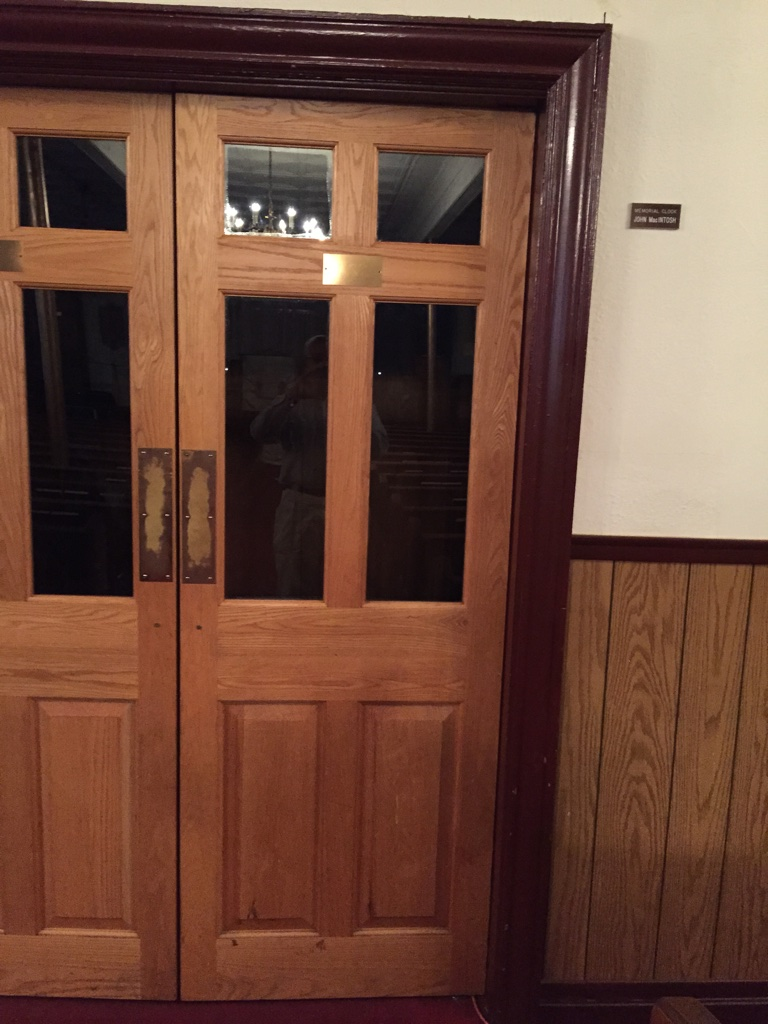
Right Sanctuary Door in memory of Anita Milne

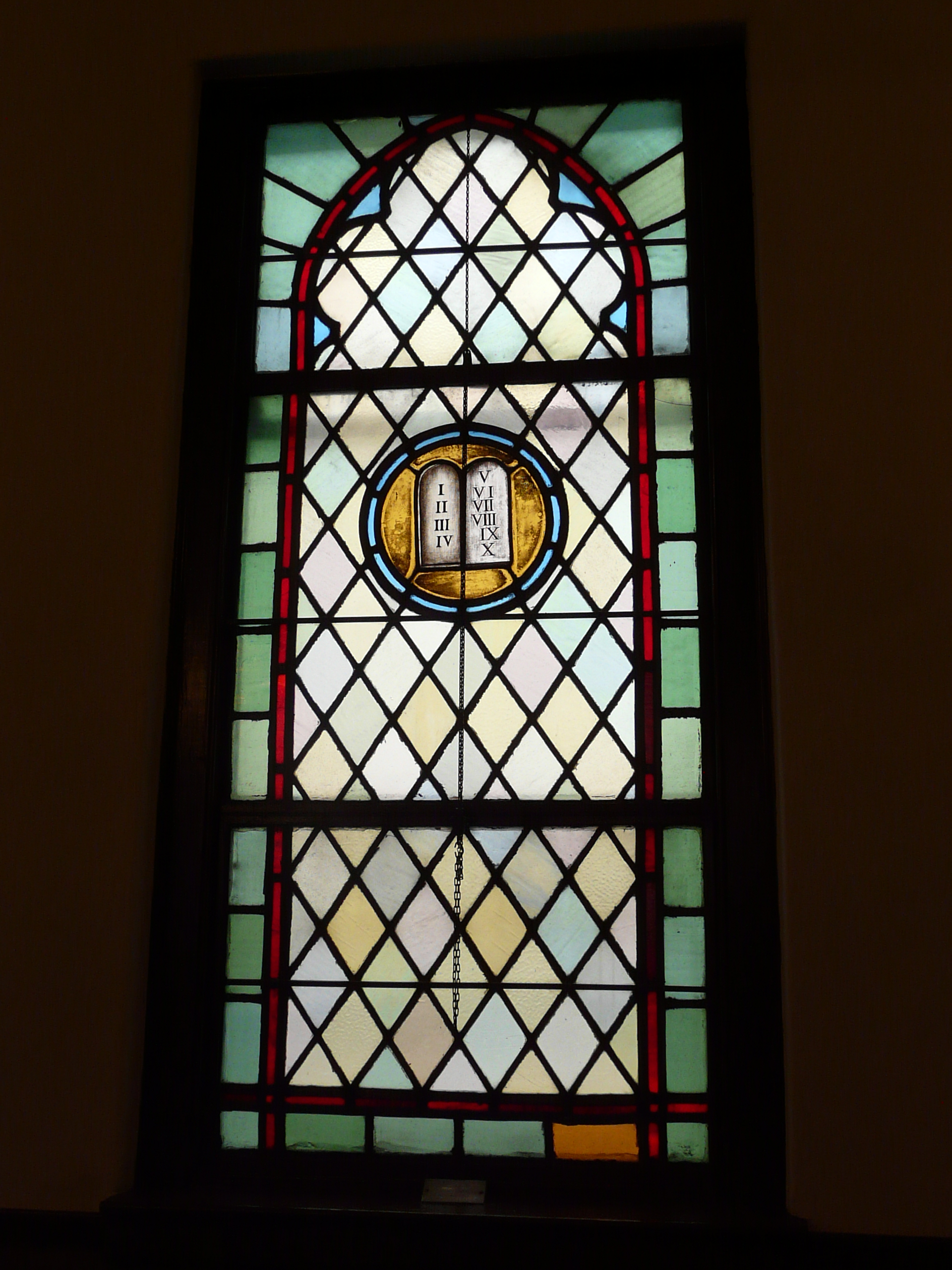
Bay Ridge United Presbyterian Church Ten Commandments Window, presented by the Church School 1937

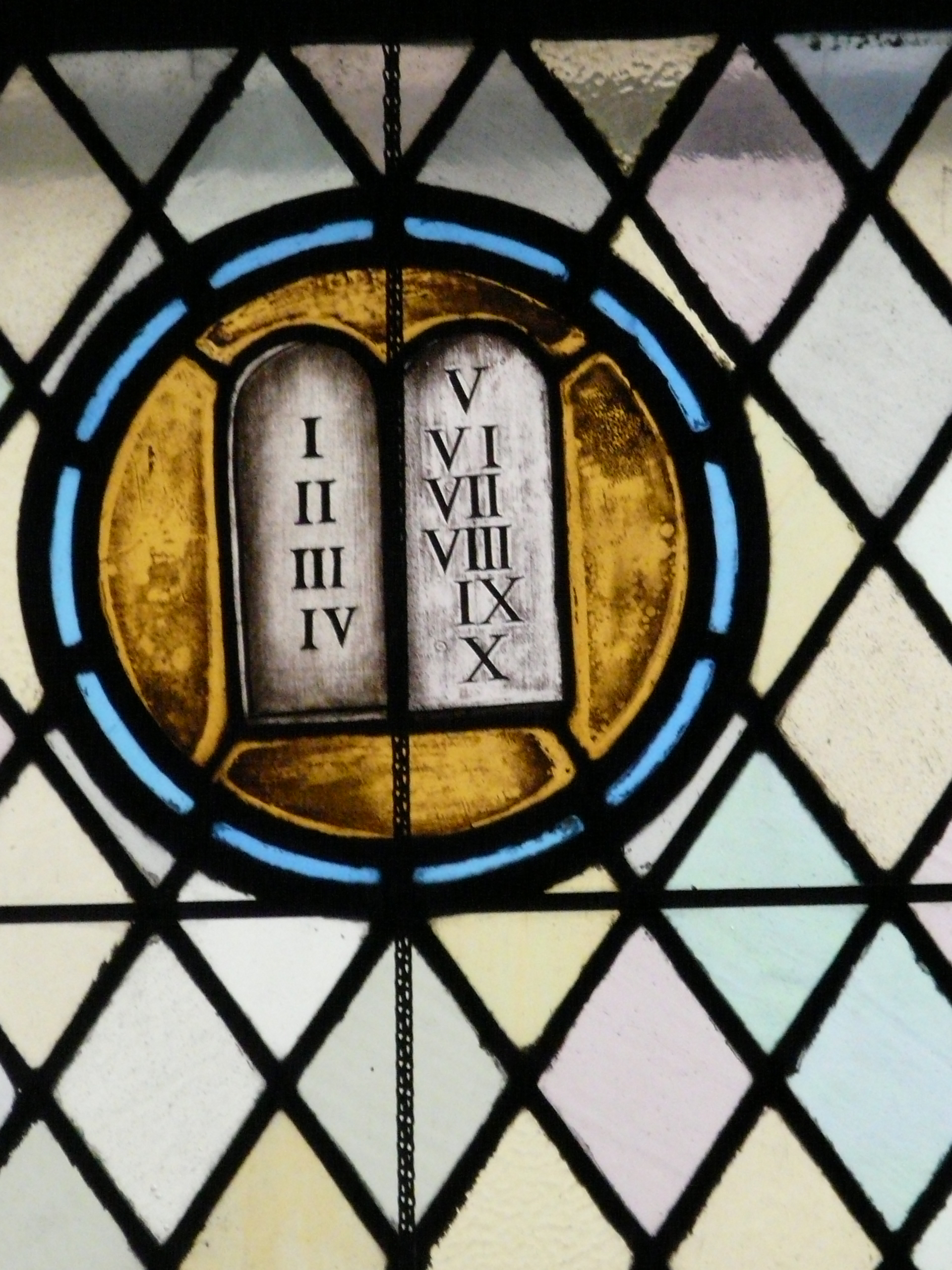
10 Commandments in BRUPC Window

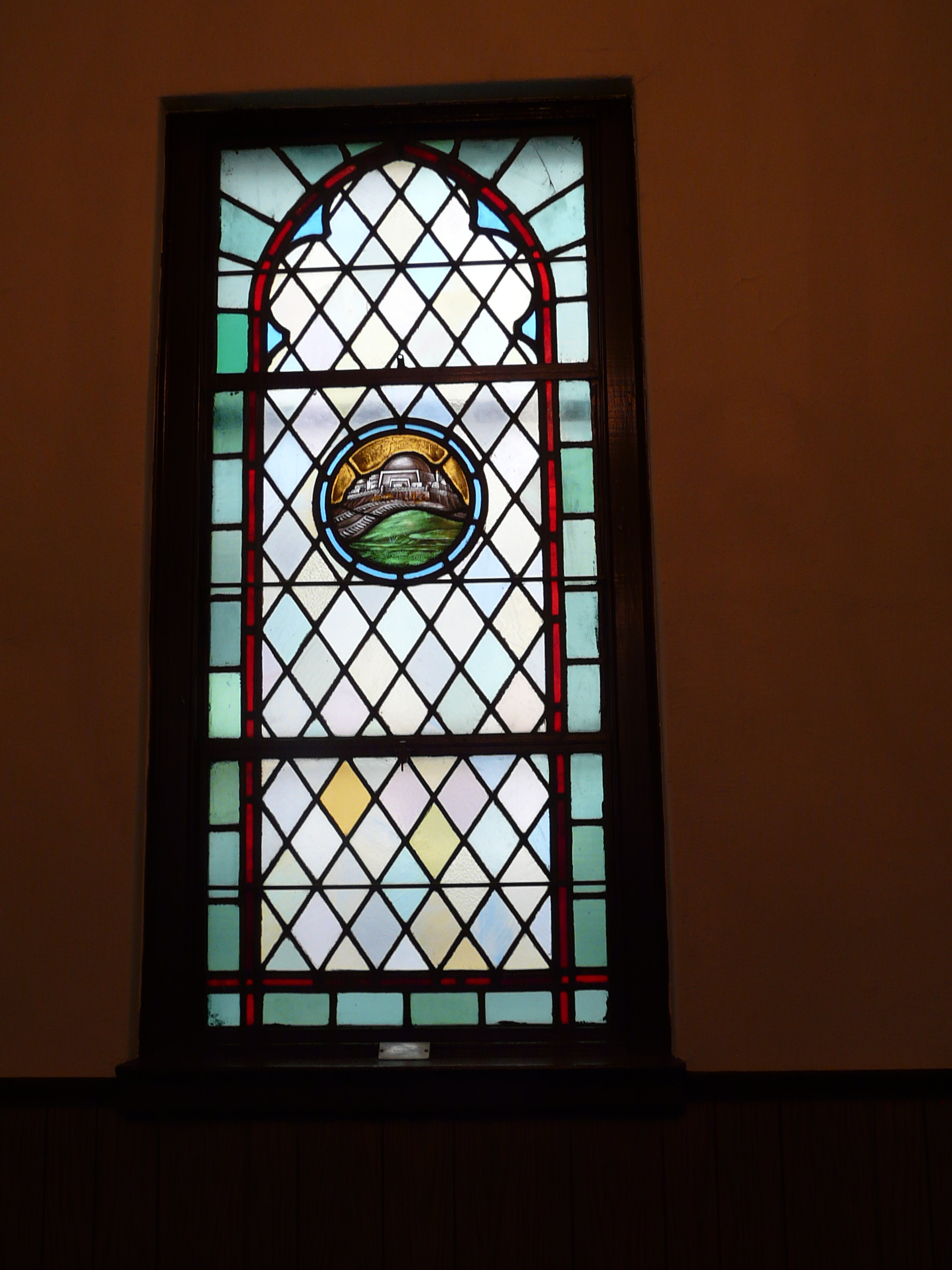
Bay Ridge United Presbyterian Church Temple Window, presented by the Womans Guild 1937

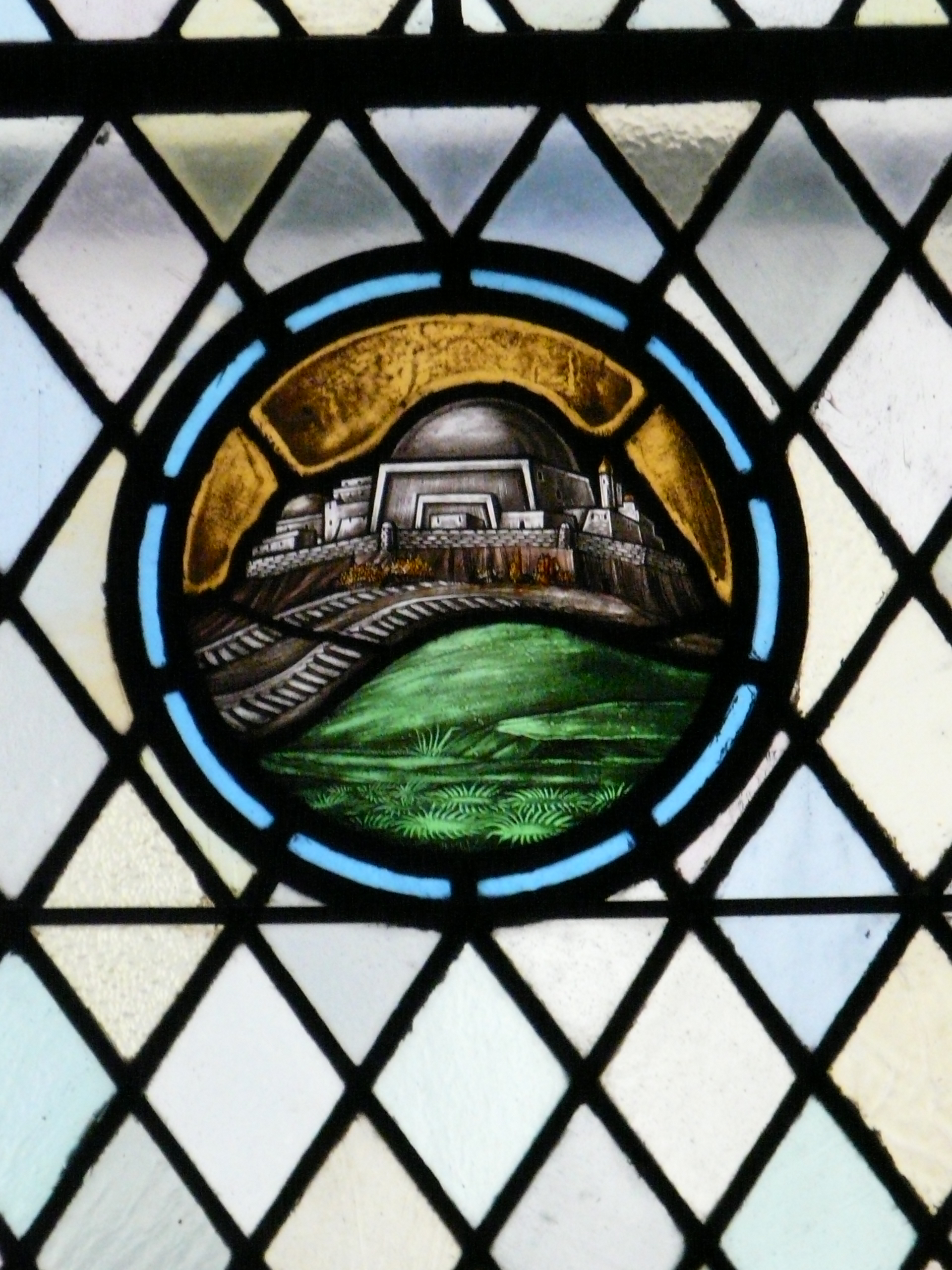
Temple in BRUPC Window

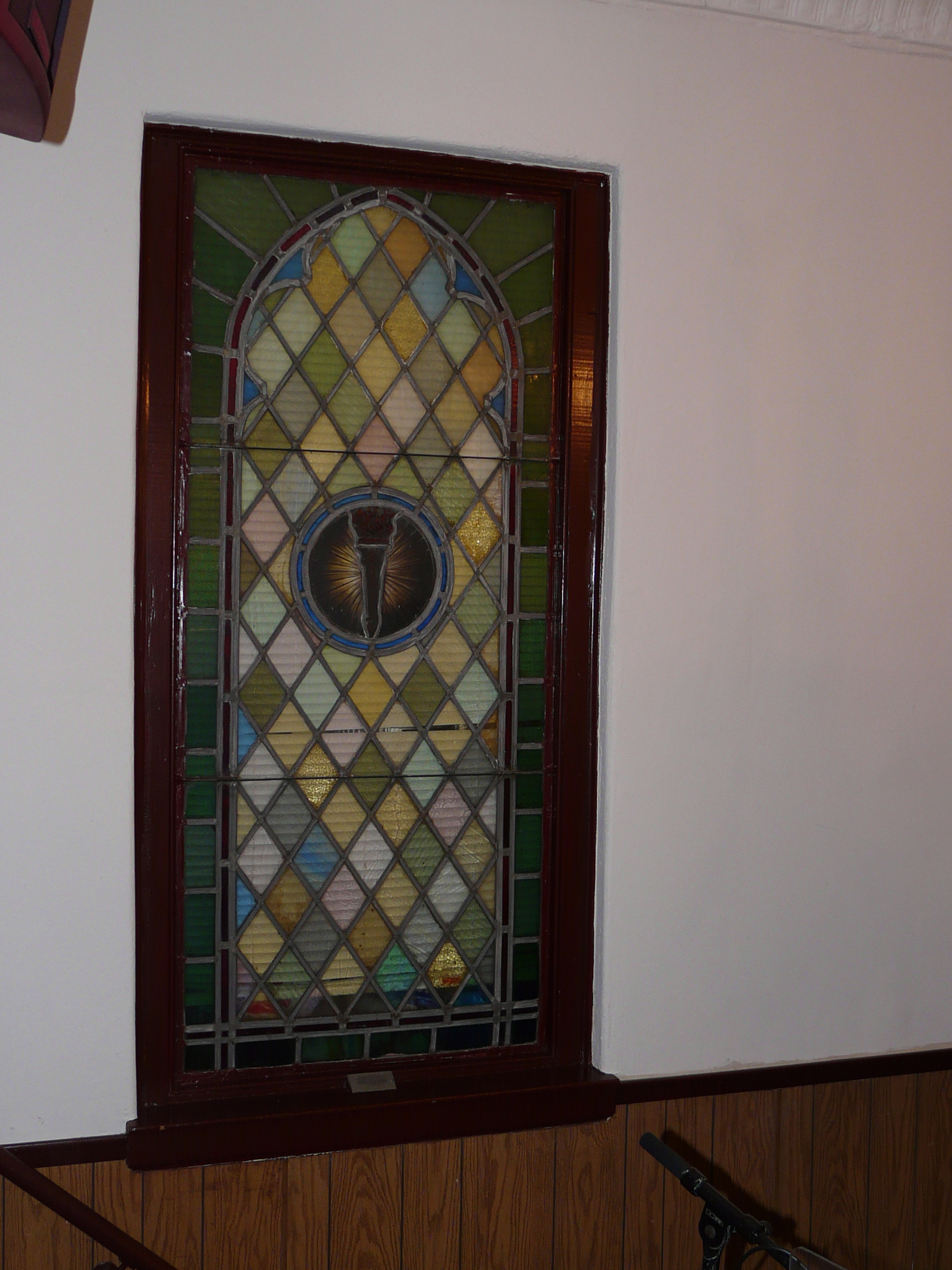
Bay Ridge United Presbyterian Church Torch Window, presented by Friends of the Church

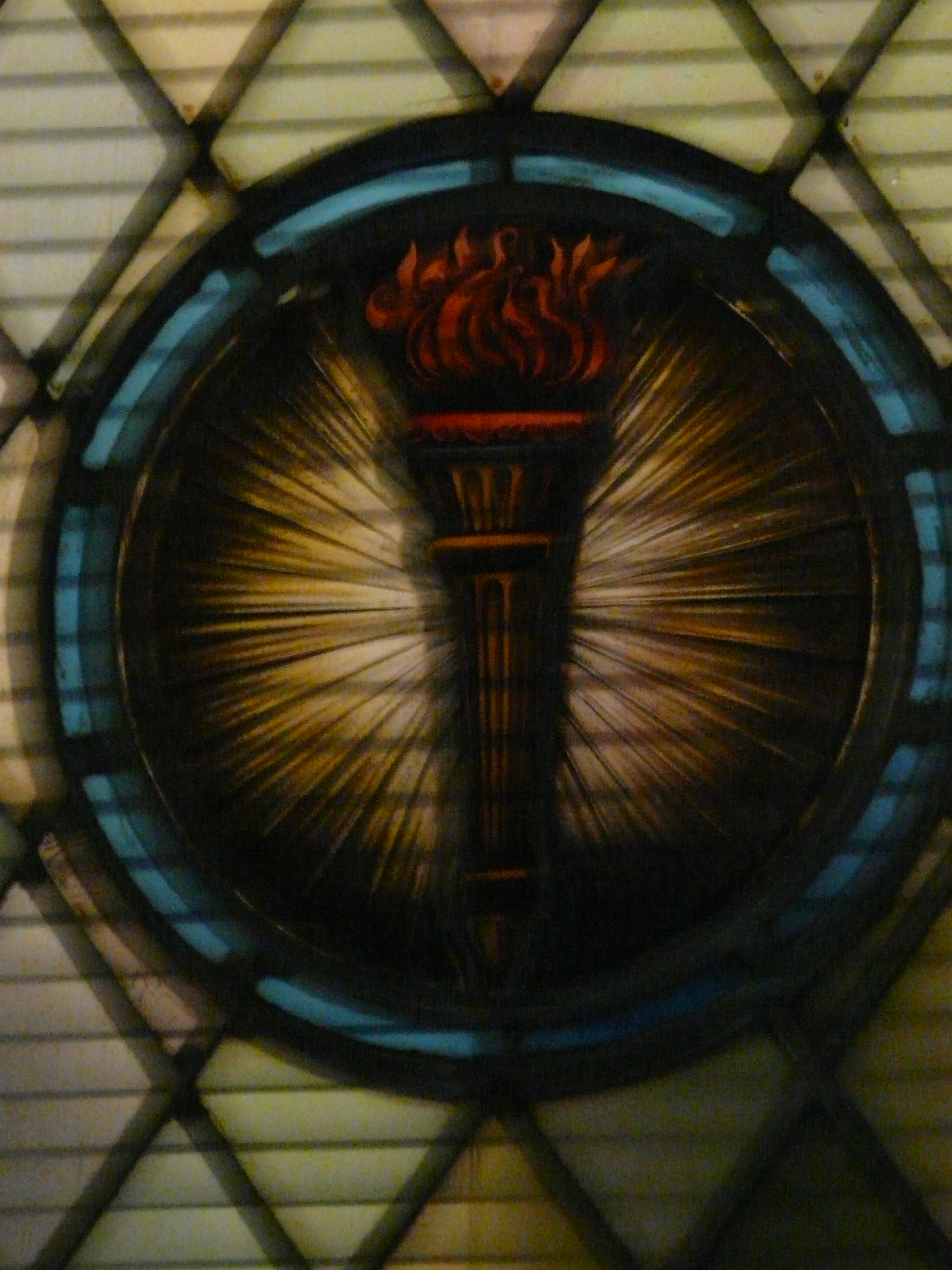
Torch of BRUPC Window

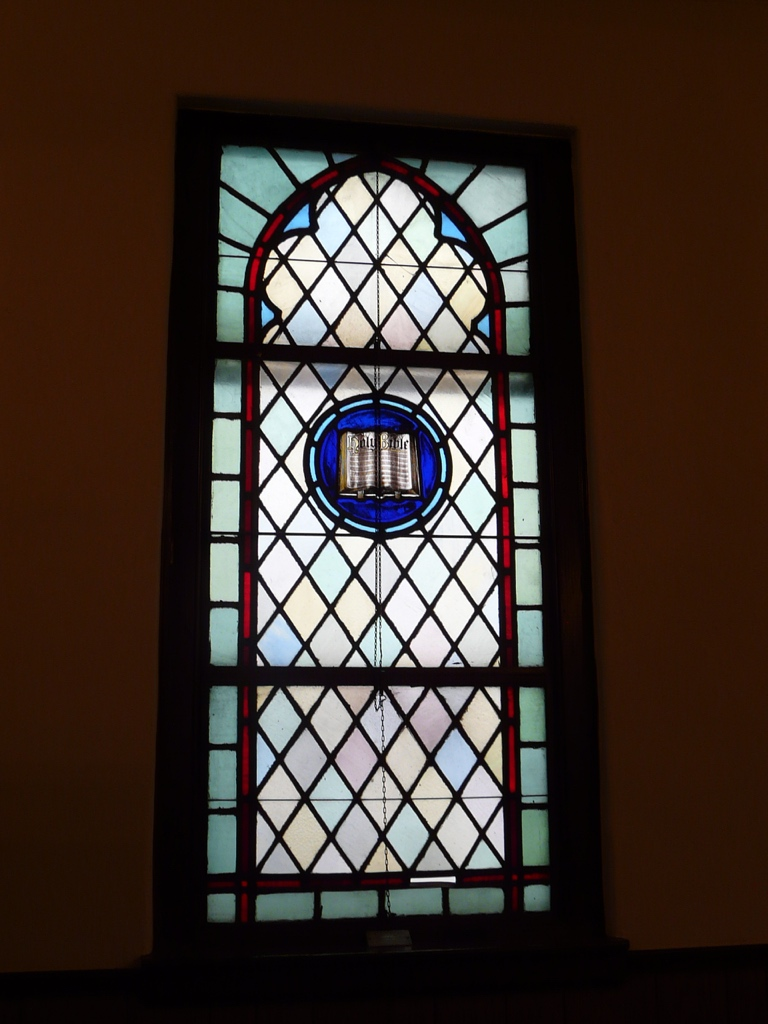
Bay Ridge United Presbyterian Church Bible Window, presented by Mr & Mrs Andrew Johnson

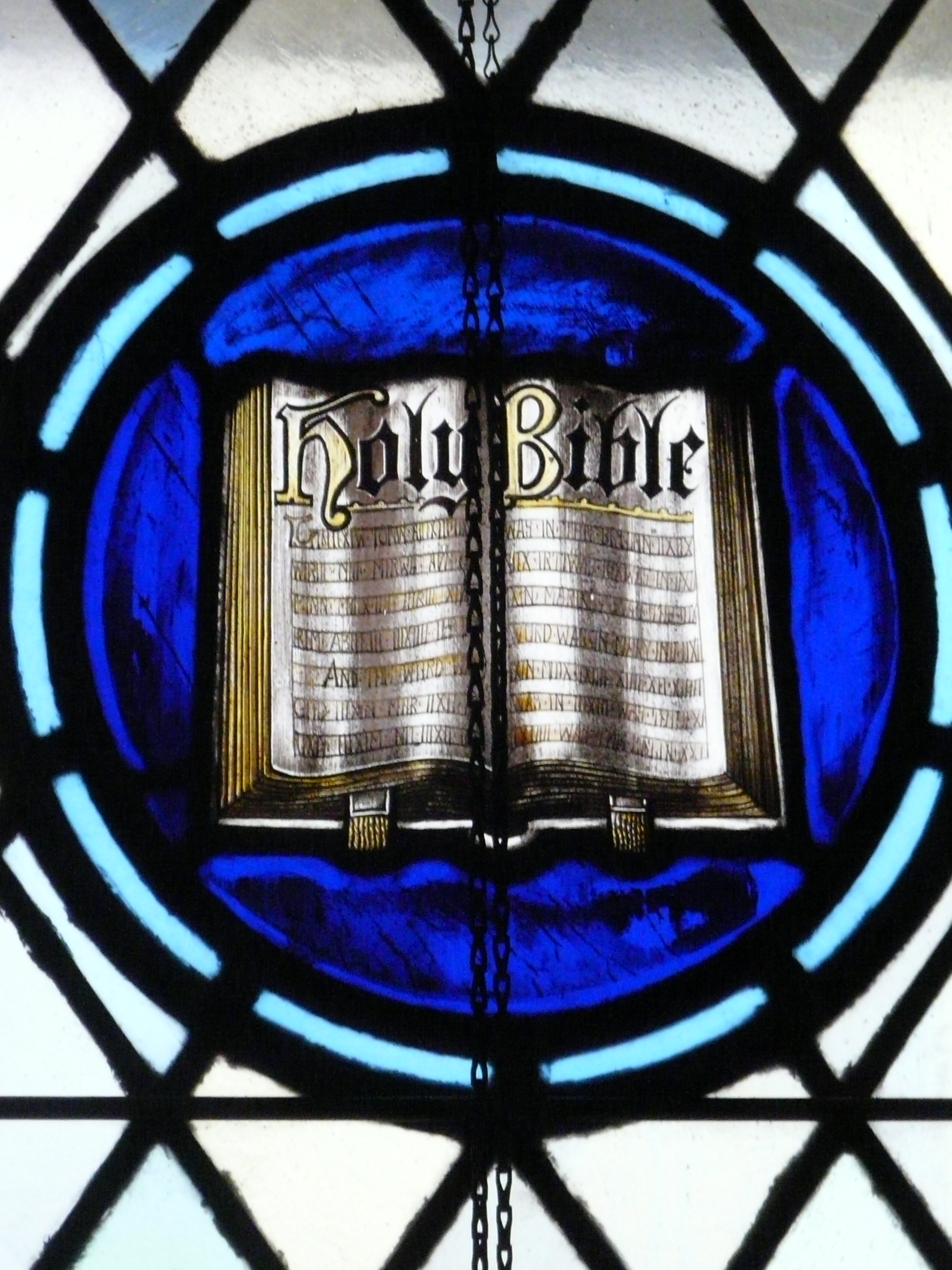
Bible from BRUPC Bible Window

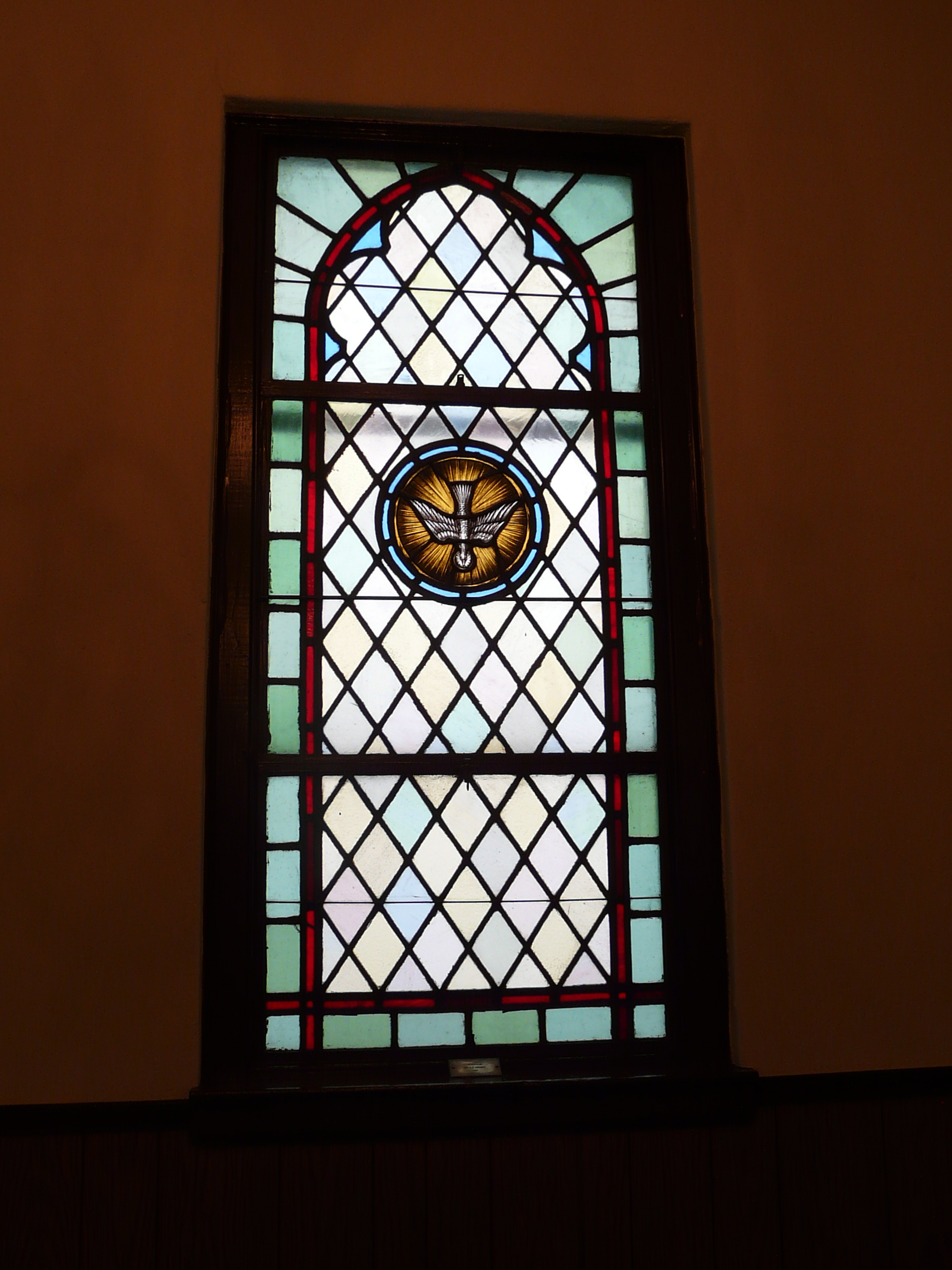
Bay Ridge United Presbyterian Church Dove Window, presented by Mr. C.E. Herbst 1937

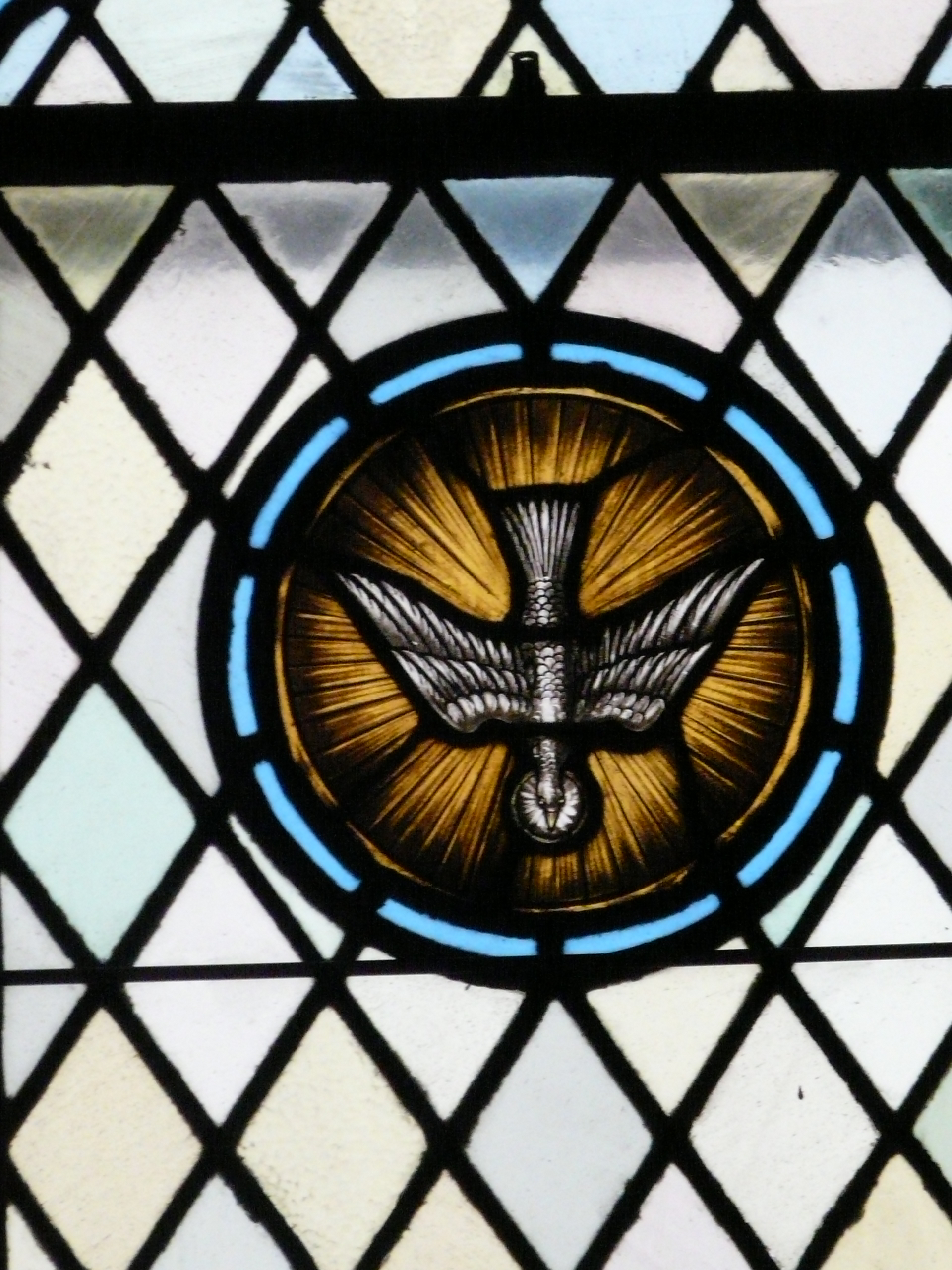
Dove from BRUPC Window

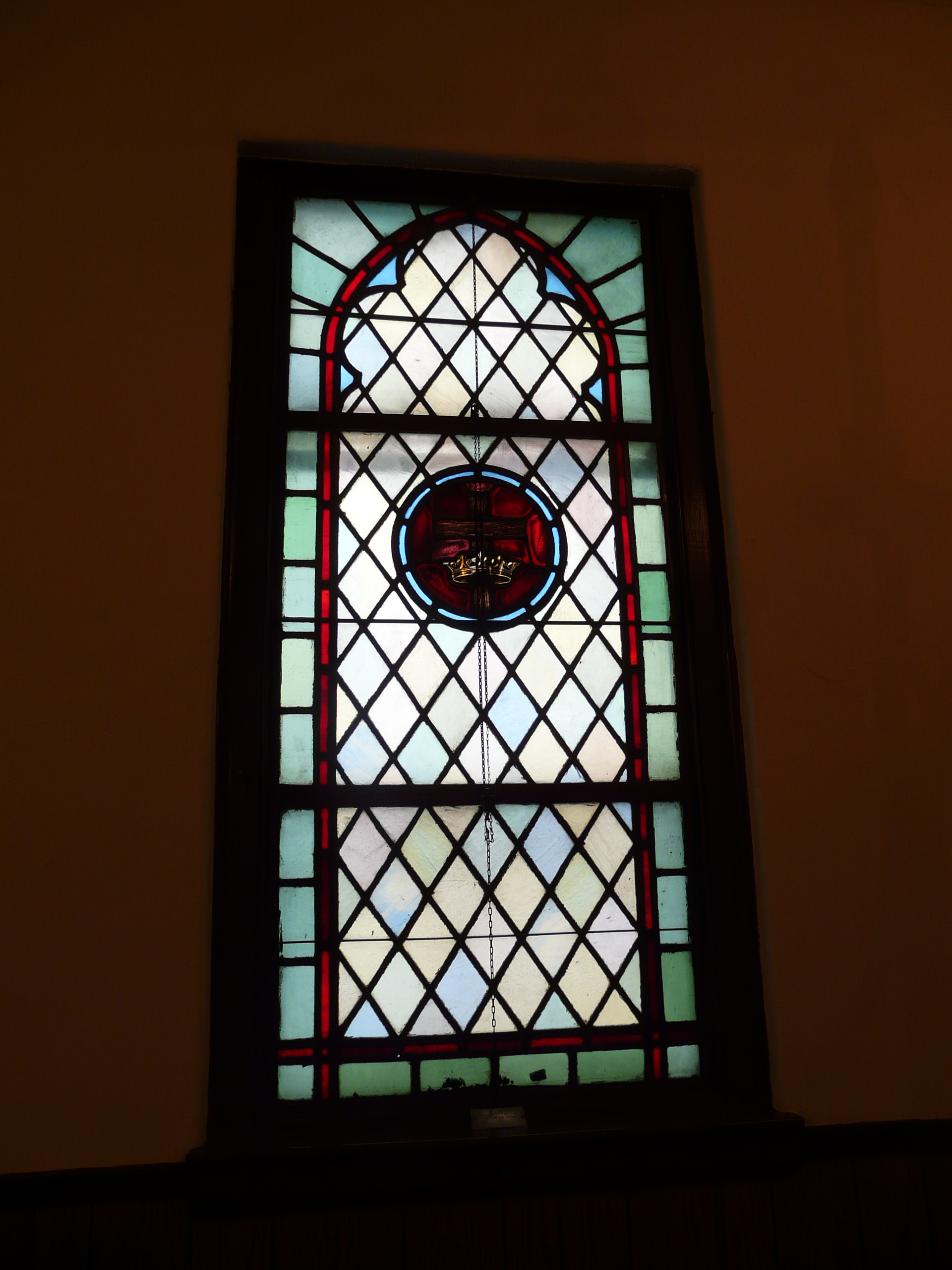
Bay Ridge United Presbyterian Church Cross & Crown Window, presented by Friends of the Church 1937

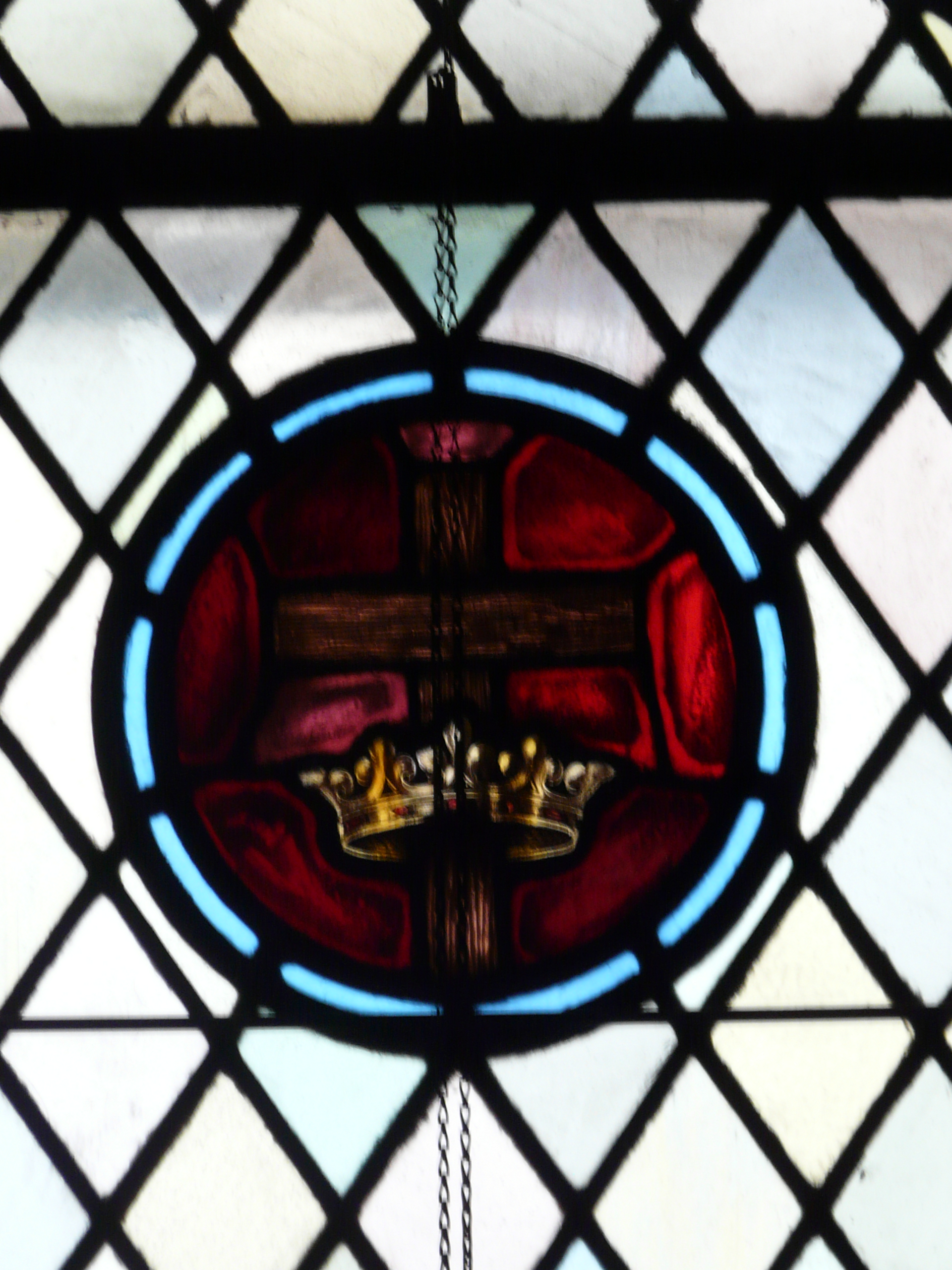
BRUPC Window Cross & Crown

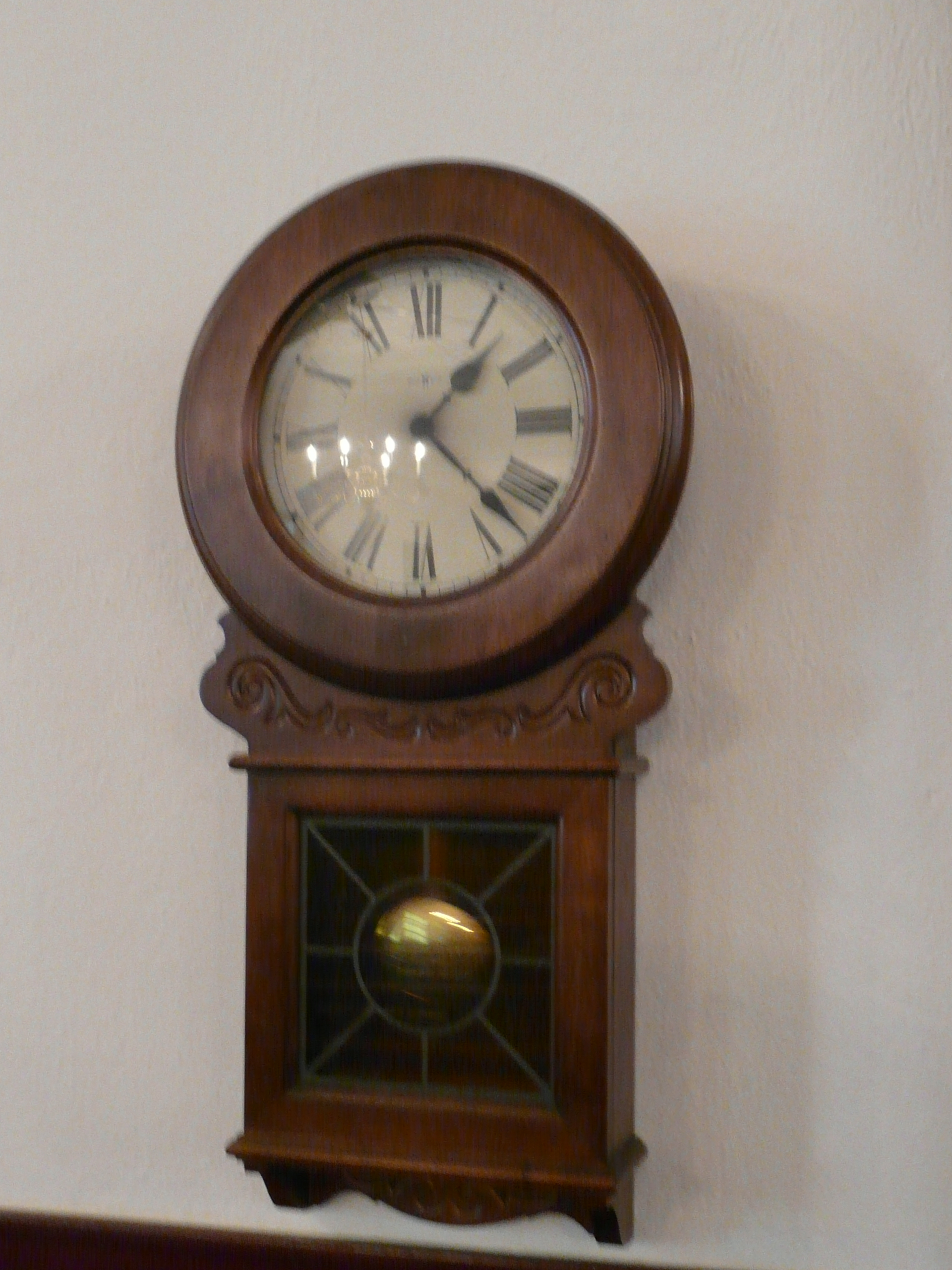
BRUC Memorial Clock, given by John McIntosh

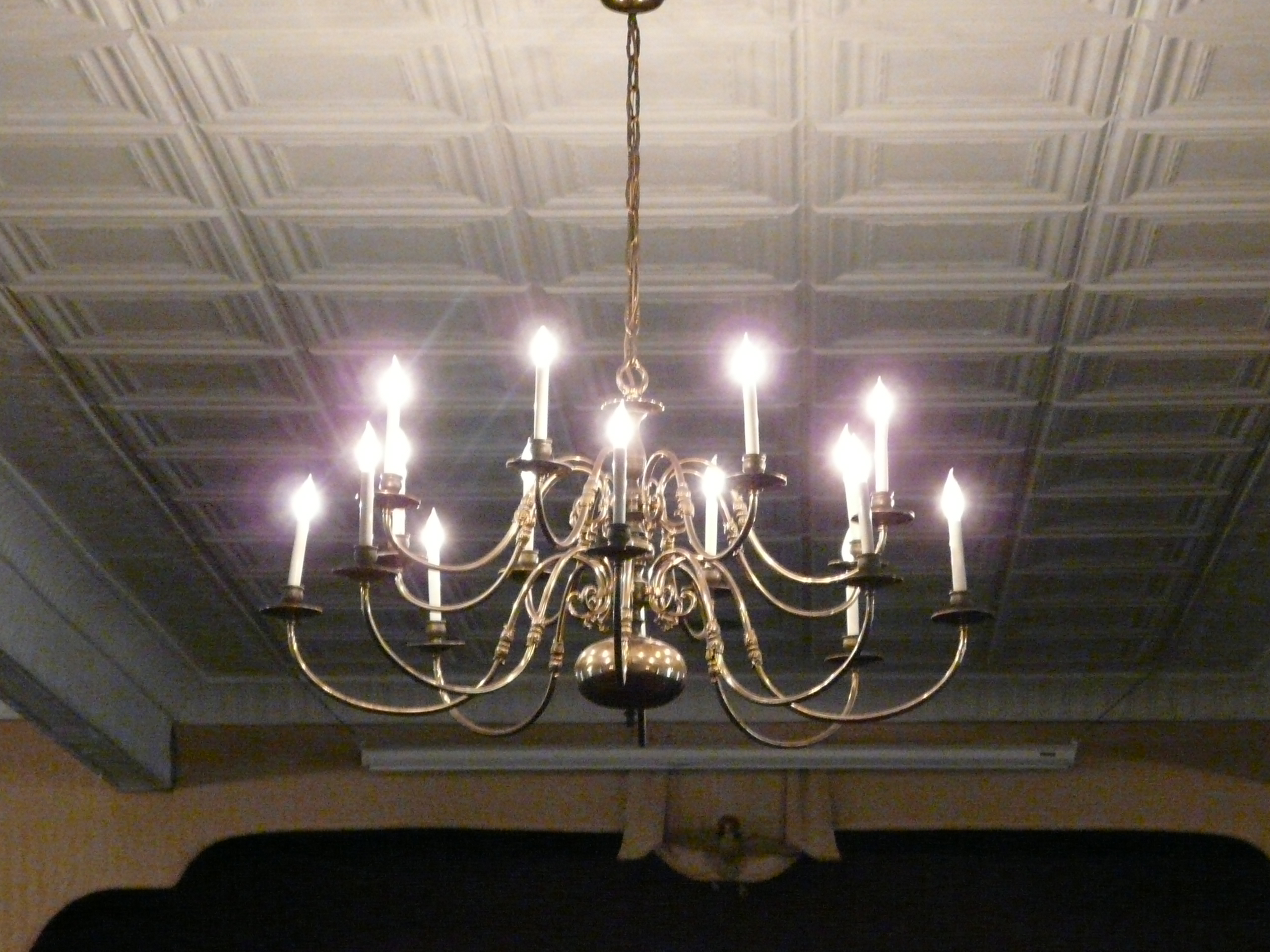
BRUC Sanctuary Center Light in Memory Jan 1967-Dec 1967]

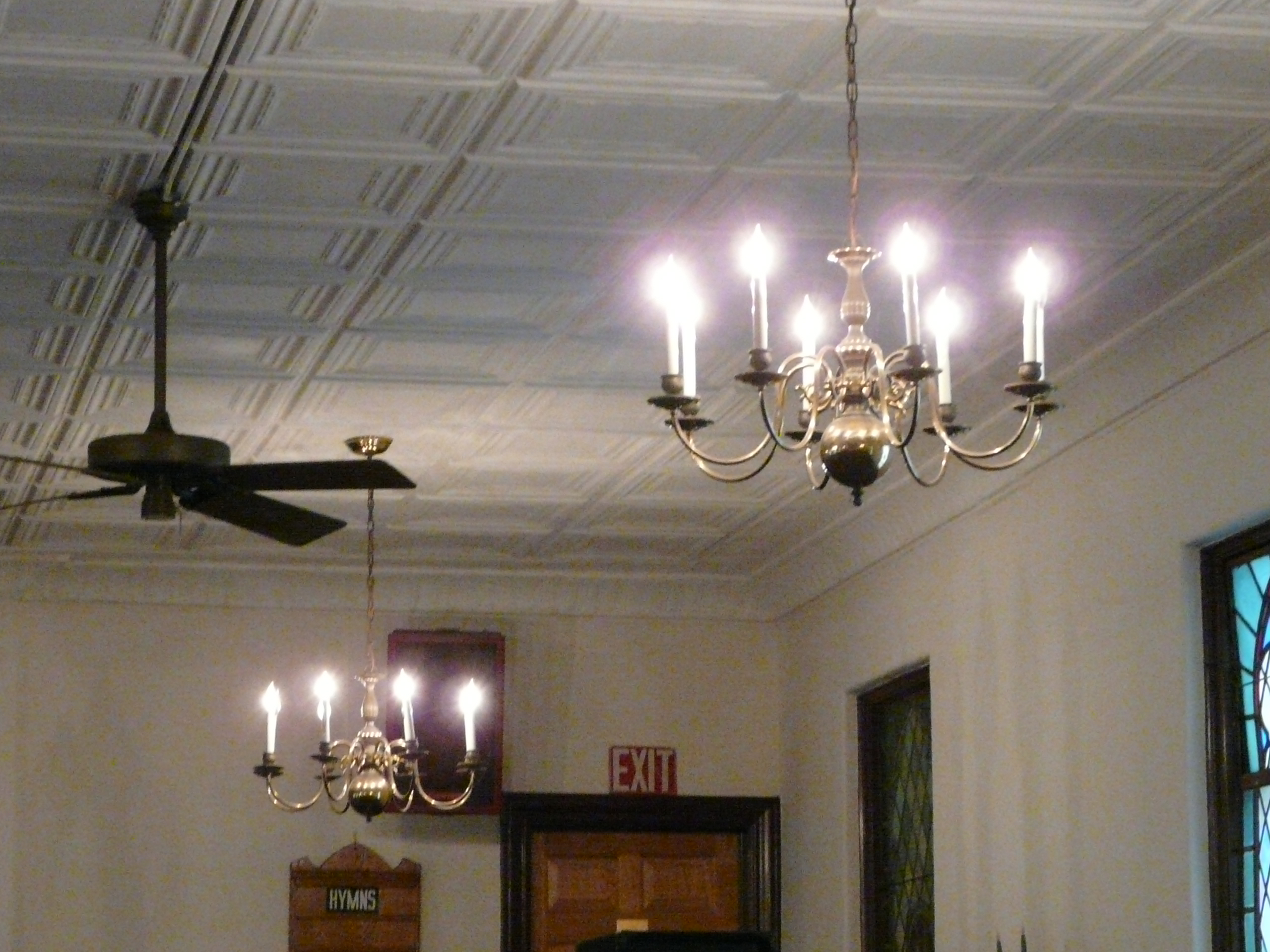
BRUC Sanctuary Side Lights in Memory Jan 1967-Dec 1967

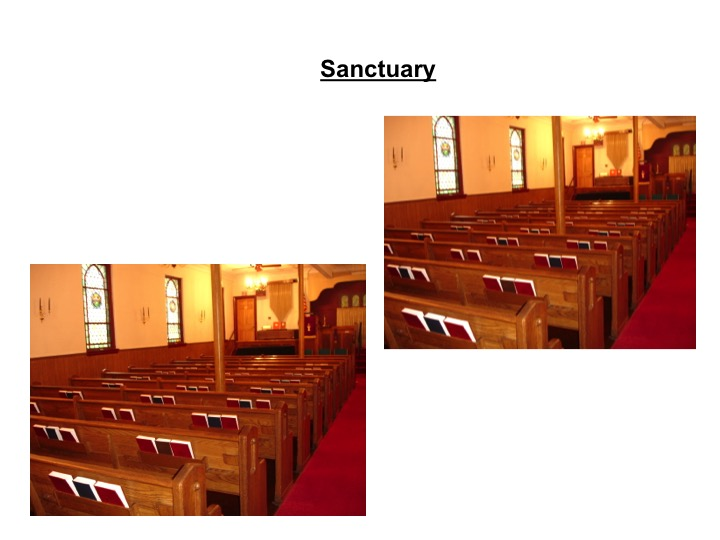
Bay Ridge United Church Pews, given by the Women's Guild, Mr. and Mrs. Frank Kurz, Mr. and Mrs. C.E. Boddy, Hazel Stuart and Family, Mrs. Katherine Simpson, Mr. and Mrs. C. Slingerland, Mrs. Raymond O'Keefe, Mrs. Leslie Larsen, Mr. and Mrs. L. Rackett, Mr. and Mrs. R. Matheson Jr., Mr. and Mrs. Allan F. Walker, Mrs. Elizabeth B. Fox, Mr. H.F. Bent, Mr. J.C. Bent, Mrs. James Lawrie, Mrs. Andrew Johnson, Mr. A.L. Smedley and The Roger Family

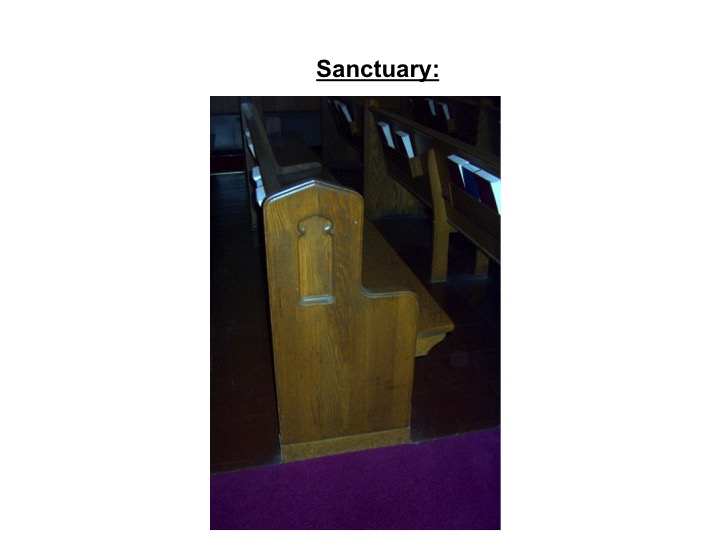
Bay Ridge United Church Pew in Memory of: Loved Ones, Georgene Mahon, Lt. Alan Boddy, Alexander Stuart, O'Keefe and Larsen Parents, Mr. and Mrs. James Littlejohn, Miss Alice Nicoll, Mr. and Mrs. Charles MacLean, Mr. and Mrs. Thomas Roden, Margaret Fraser, Thomas C. Bent, Mr. James Lawrie, Mr. and Mrs. D. Laverty, Andrew Johnson and Albert Fish Smedley

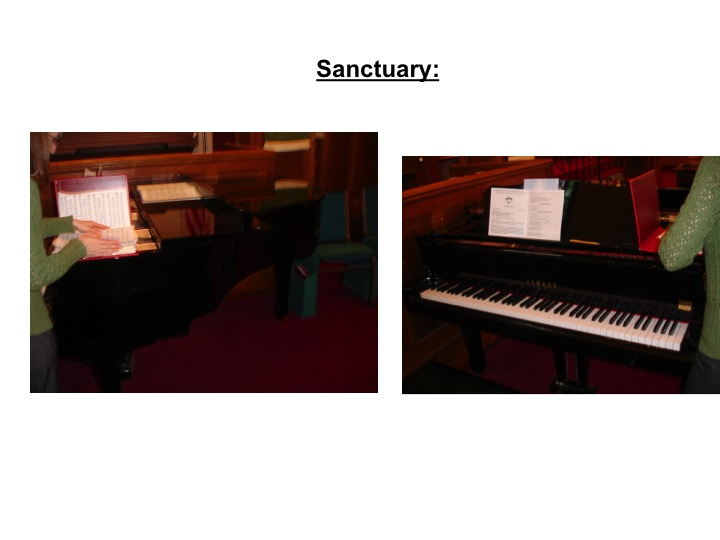
BRUC Grand Piano moved to 4th Avenue Presbyterian Church

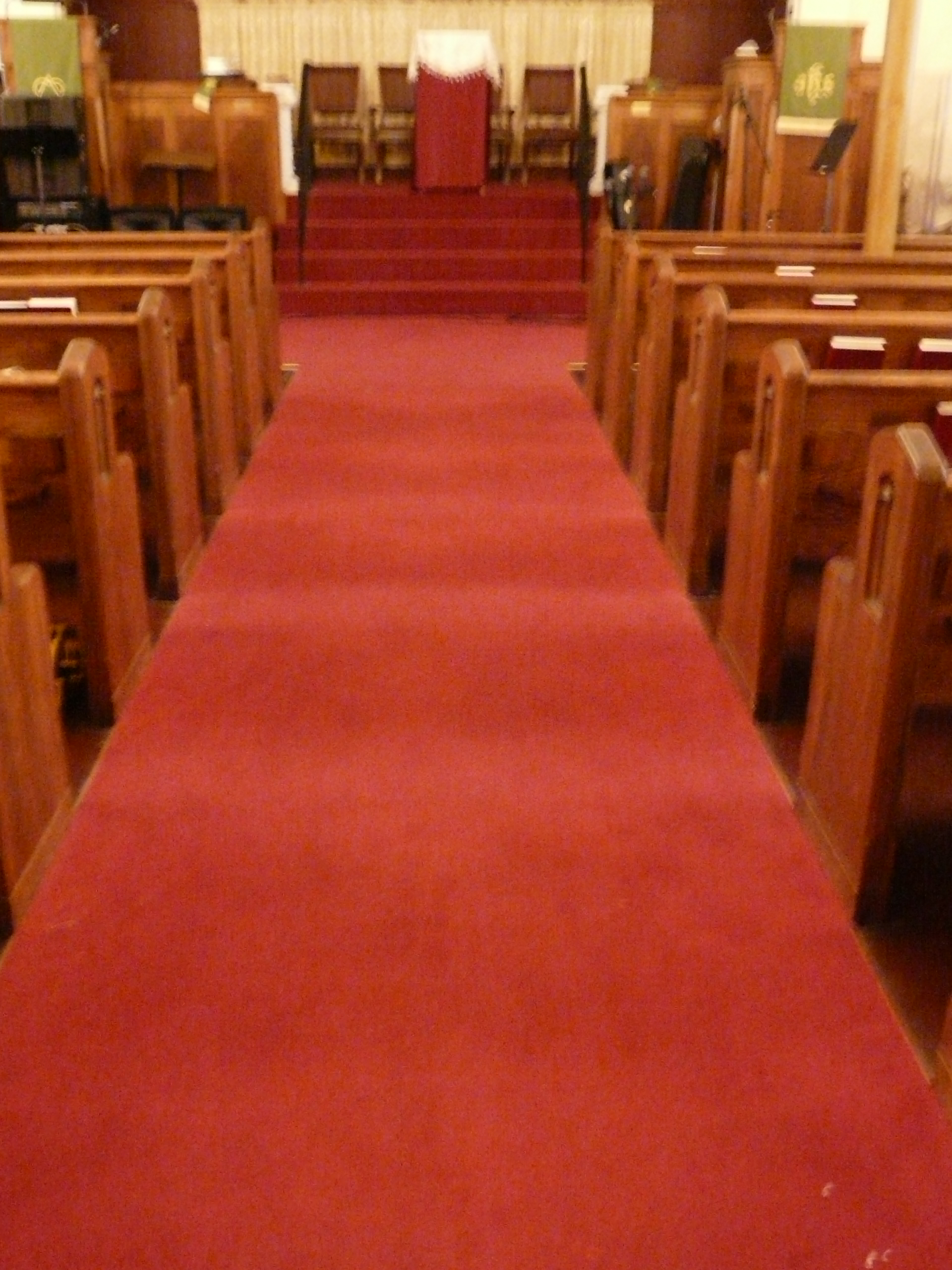
BRUC Carpeting in Loving Memory of Alice Littlejohn Sitterly 2000

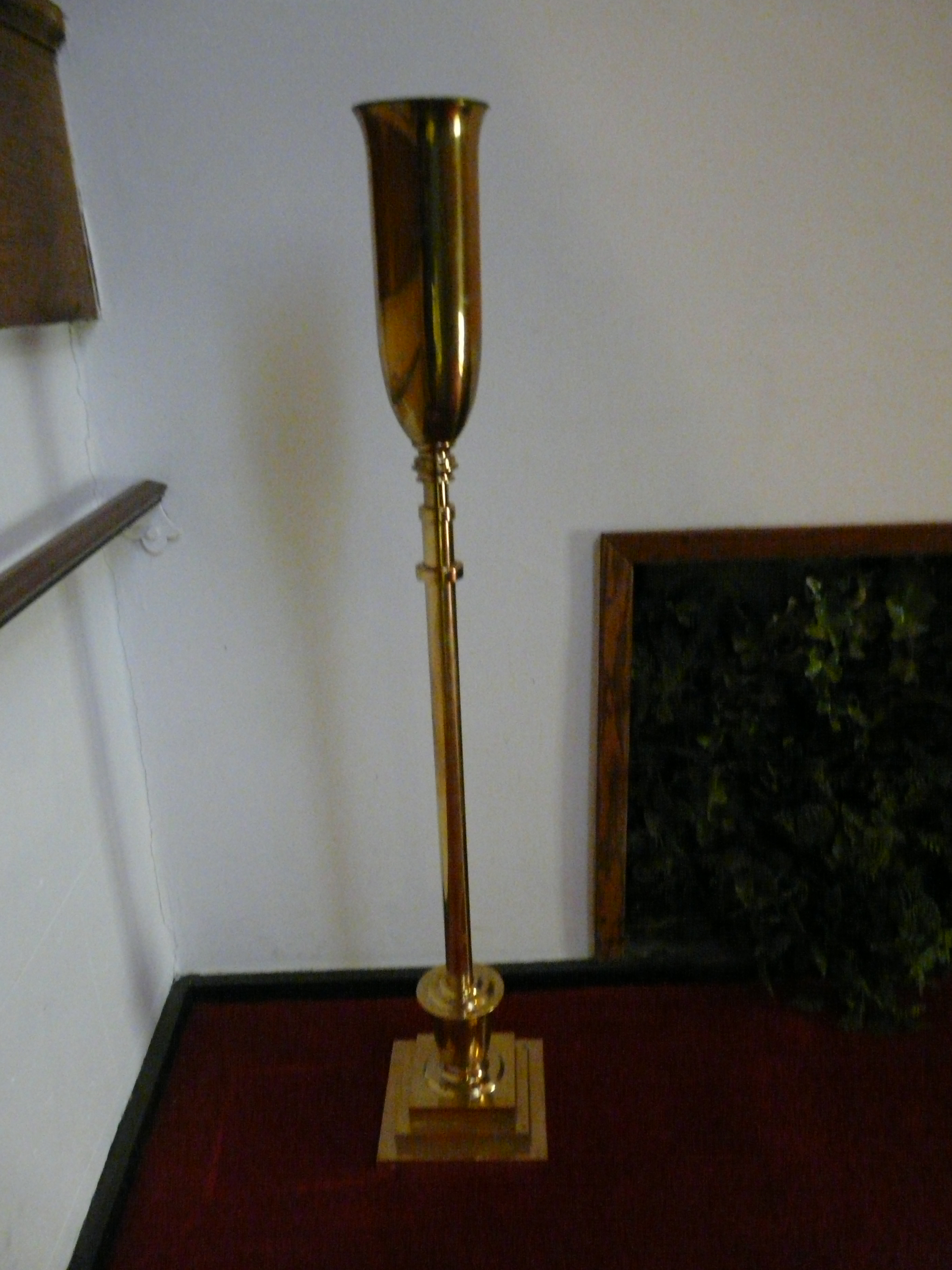
Bay Ridge United Church Vases in Memory of Kari Sando and Violet B Baldwin moved to 4th Avenue Presbyterian Church

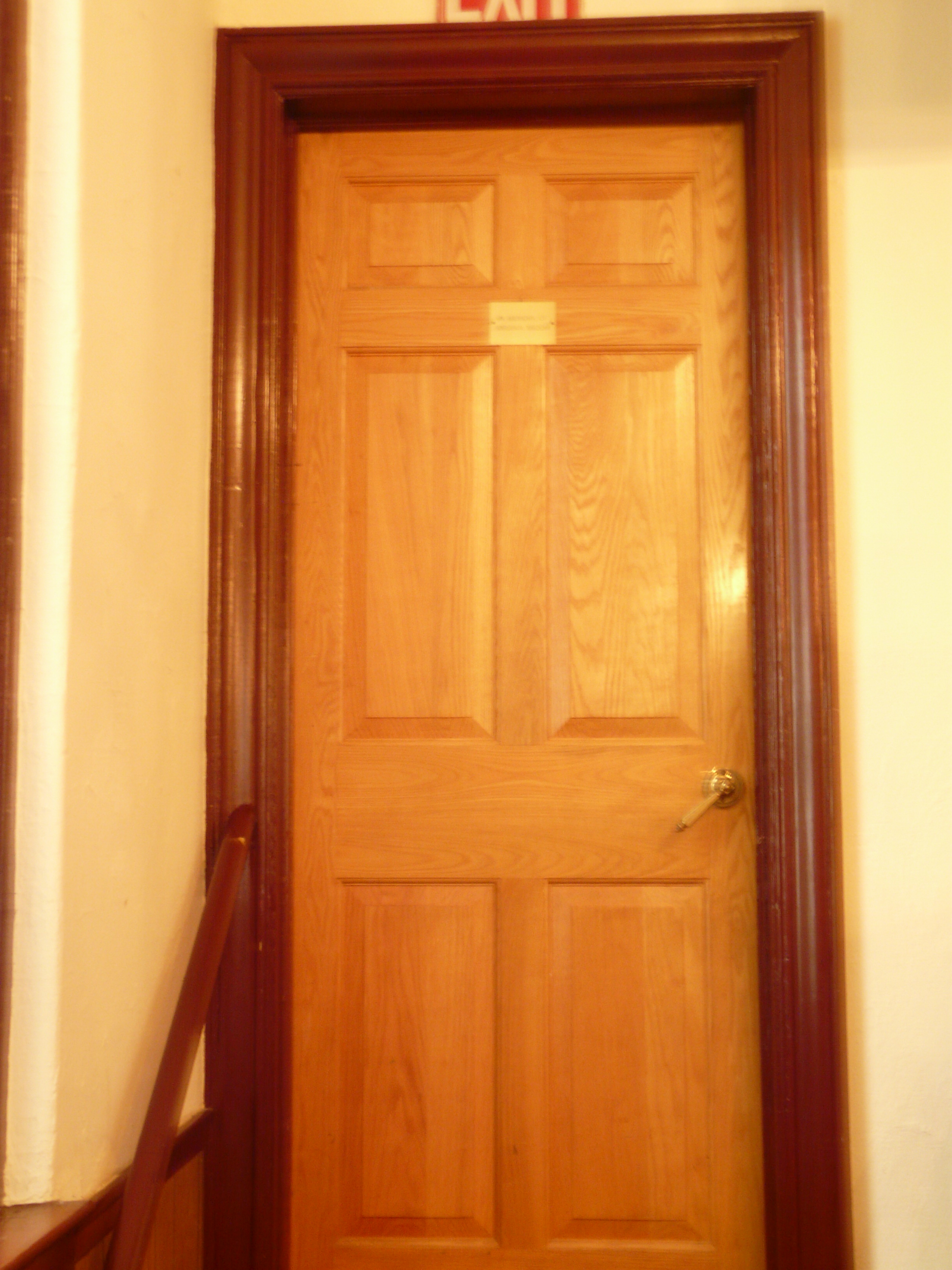
Bay Ridge United Church Sanctuary Doors in Memory of Virginia Vroom and Gertrude Roden

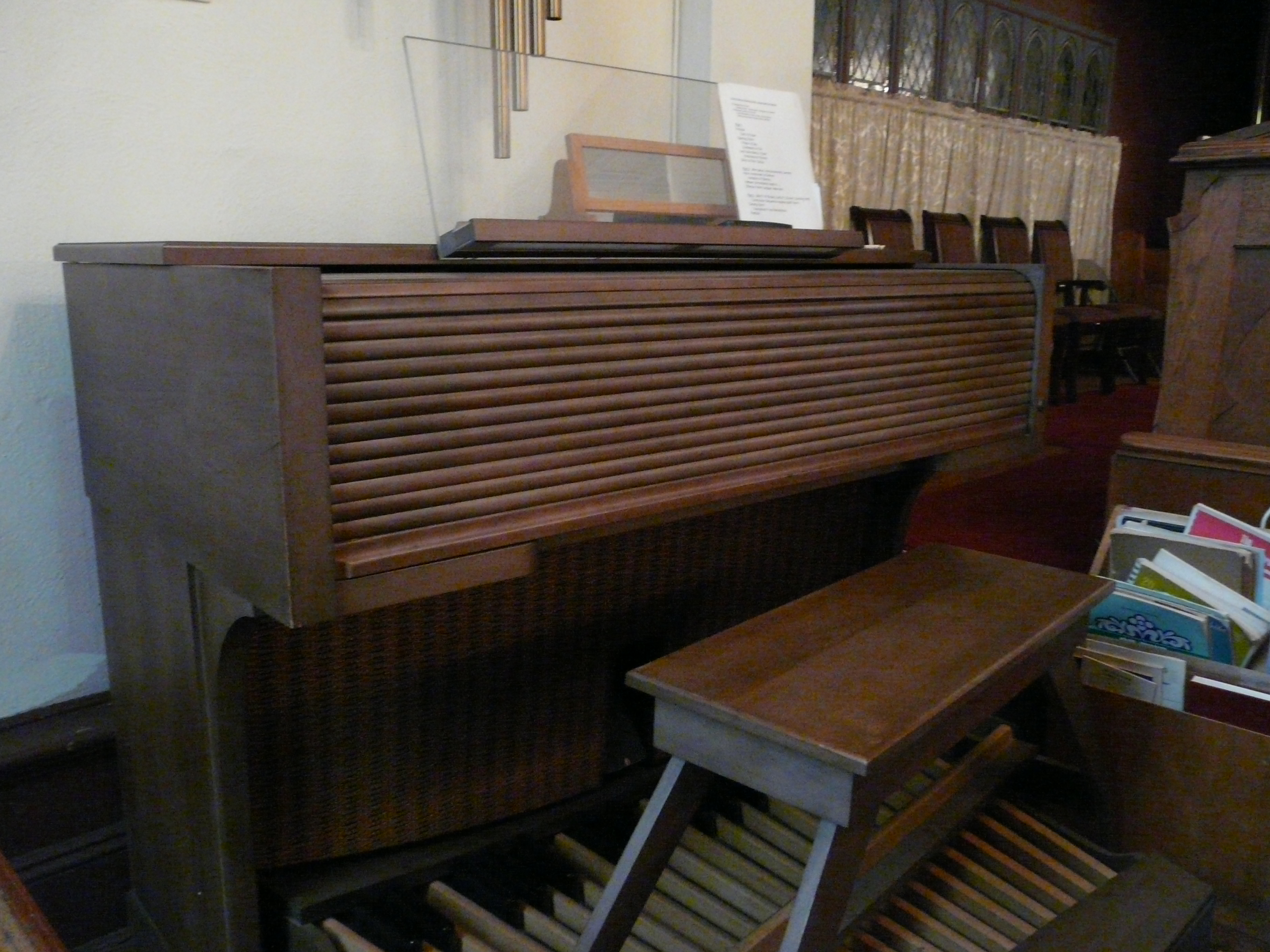
Bay Ridge United Presbyterian Church Organ - a Memorial of Music

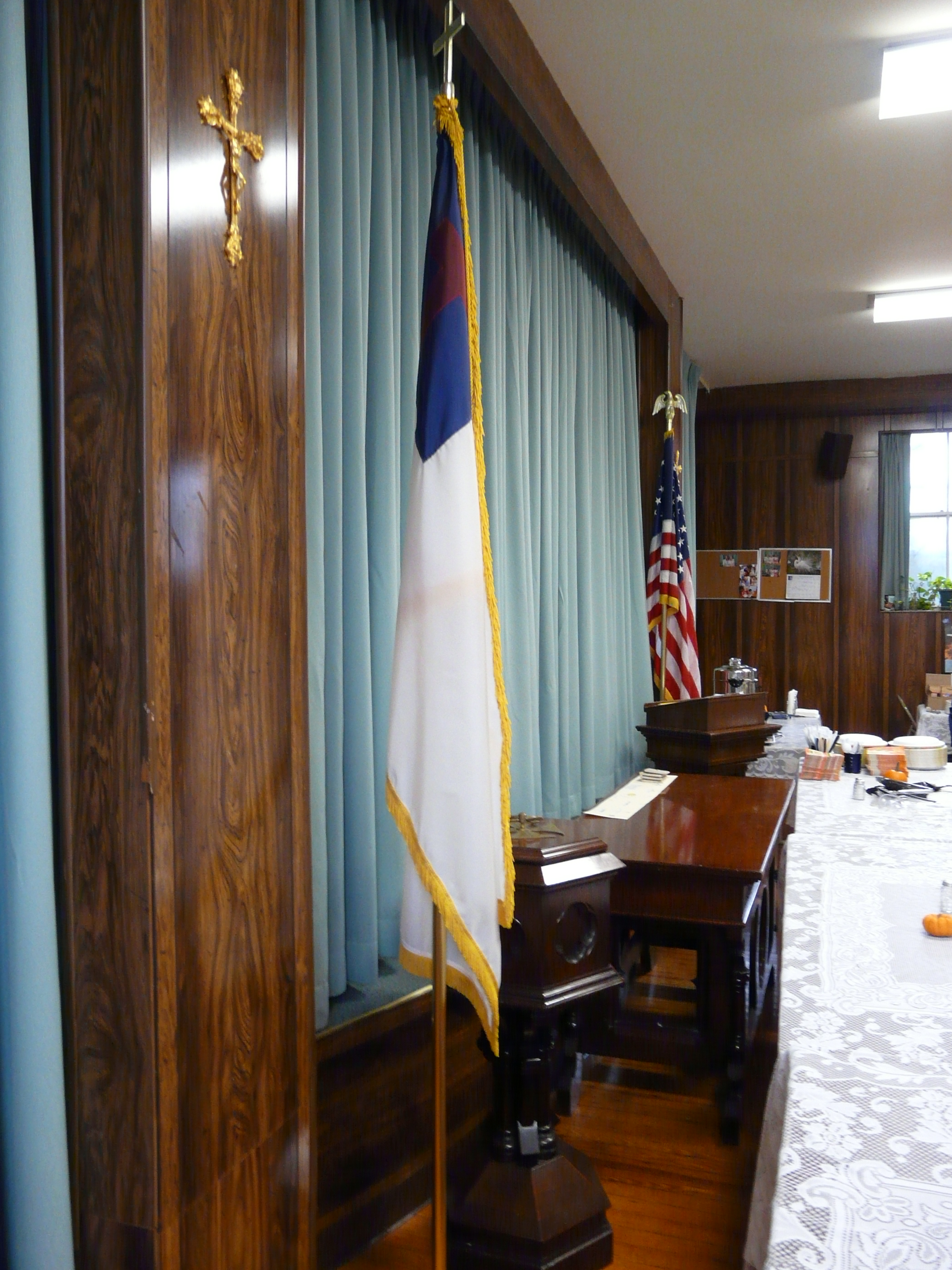
Bay Ridge United Church Christian and American Flags in Memory of Andrew Parsons, moved to 4th Avenue Presbyterian Church

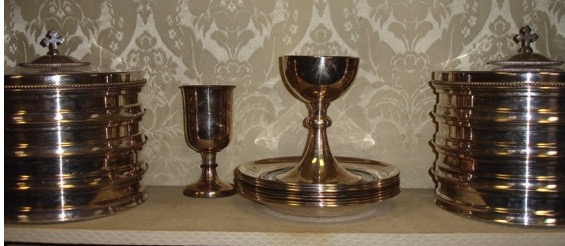
South Reformed Church Communion Set, given to Church of the Master

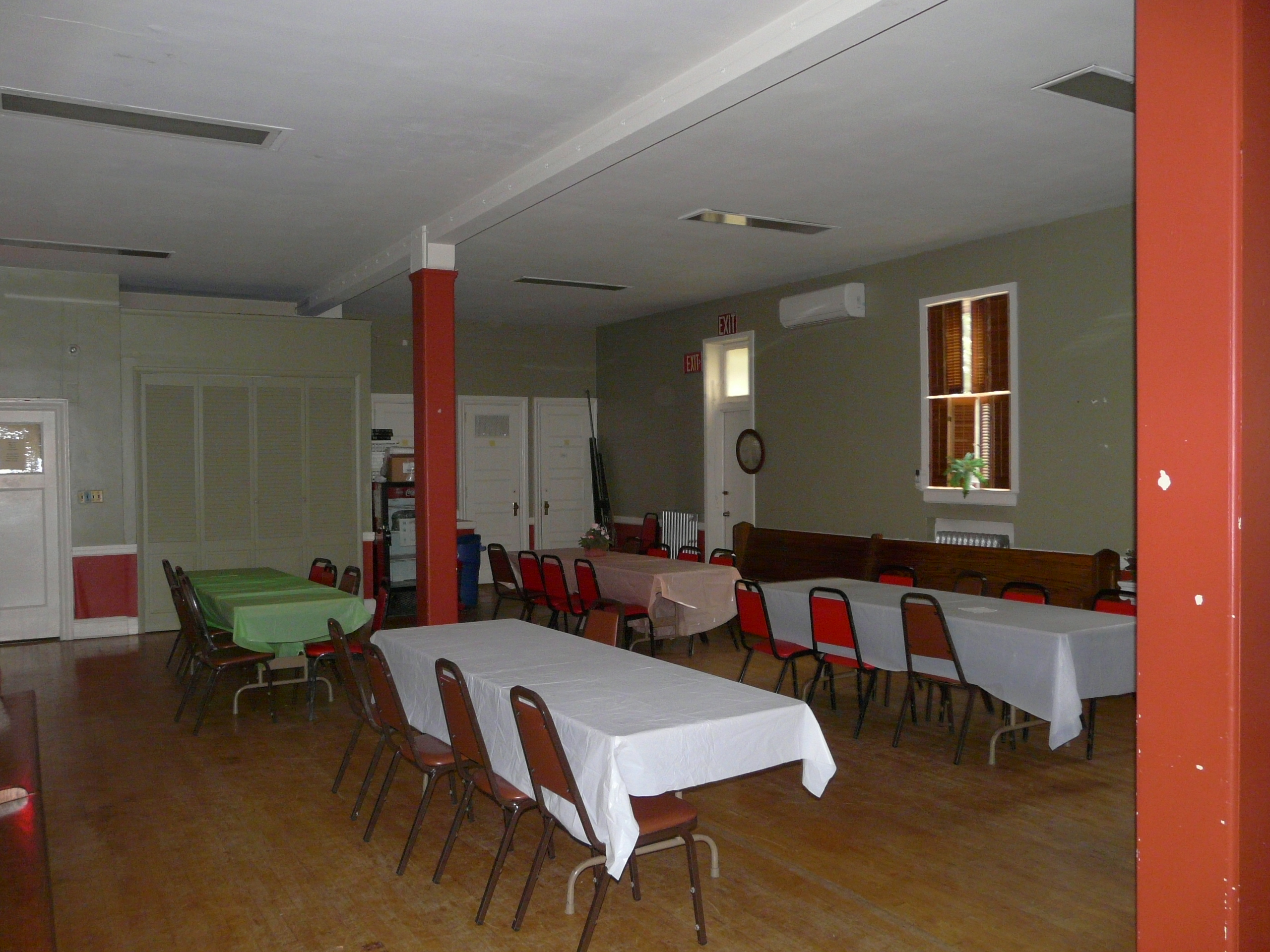
Bay Ridge United Church Hall dedicated to Kari Sando, late Choir Director and Organist

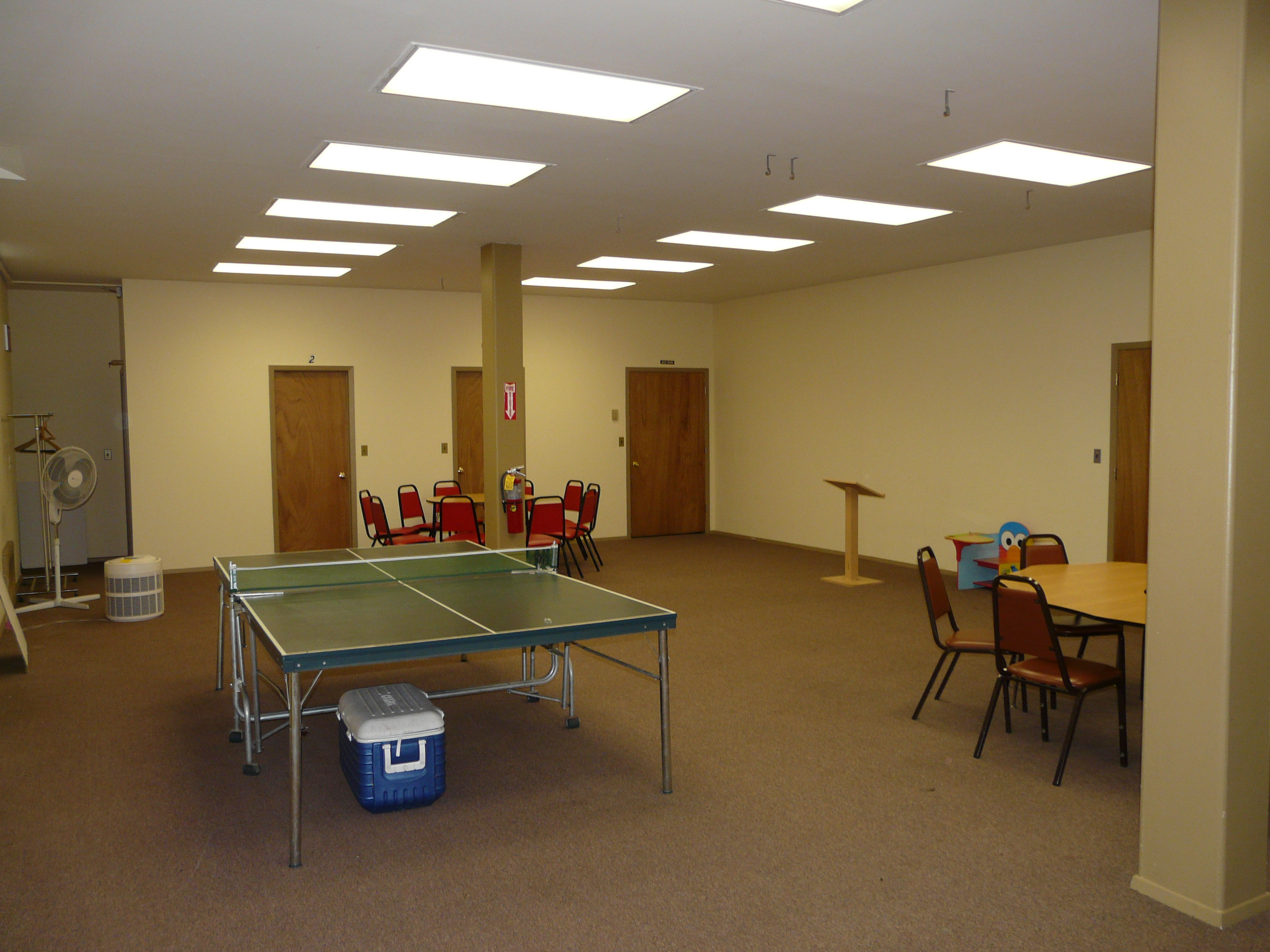
Bay Ridge United Church basement, dedicated to Phyllis Coggins, late member and Sunday School Superintendent
