= George M. Stoney =

American Navy officer and Arctic explorer (1852–1905)

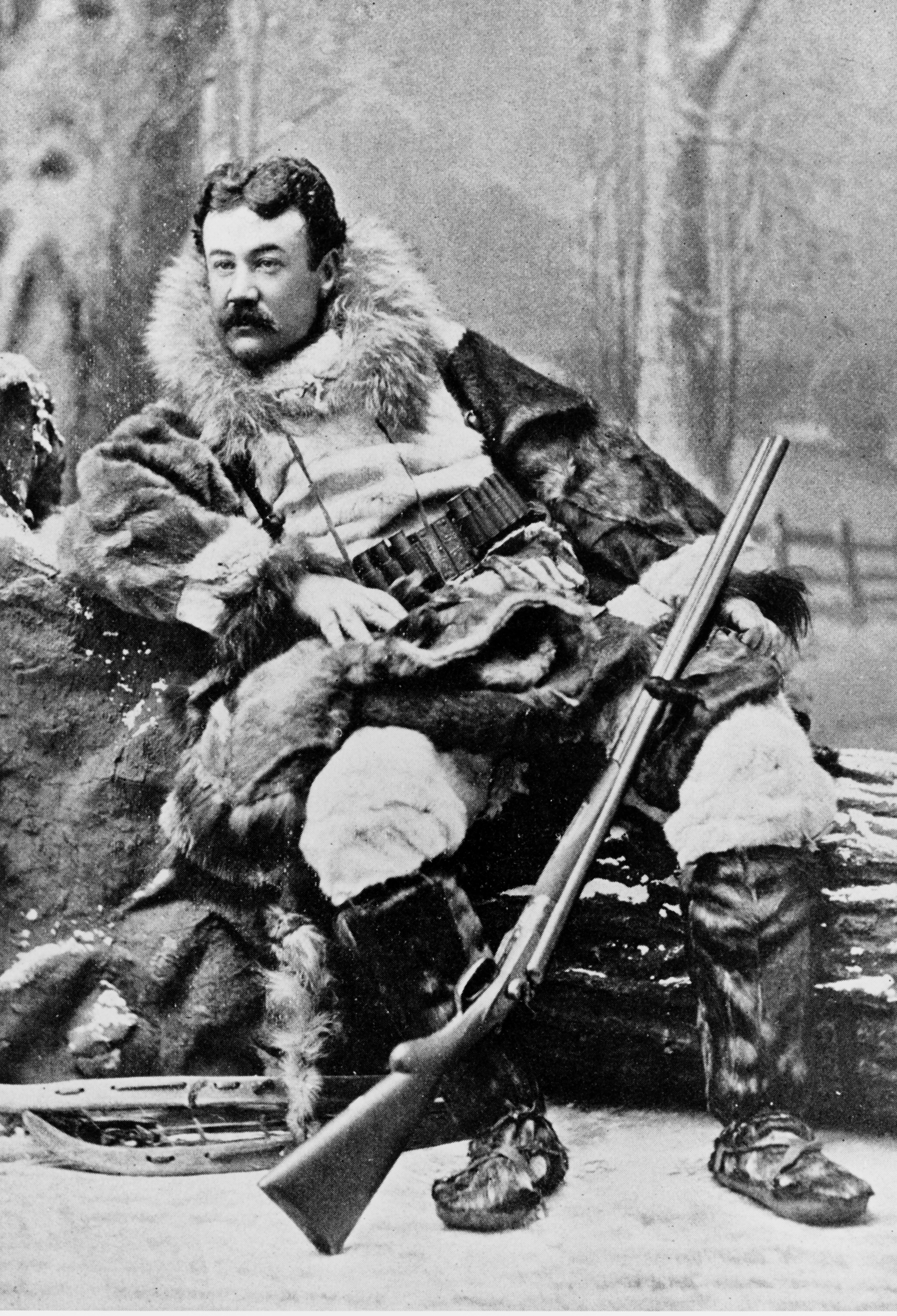
- with his Arctic gear circa 1885
- Born: 9 October 1852; Beaufort, South Carolina
- Died: 30 April 1905 (aged 52) Annapolis, Maryland
- Allegiance: United States of America
- Branch: United States Navy
- Service years: 1875–1905
- Rank: Commander
- Commands: USS Santee; USS Dolphin; USS Solace; Northern Alaska Exploring Expedition; USS Ounalaska
- Conflicts: Spanish–American War

George Morse Stoney (9 October 1852 – 30 April 1905) was a United States Navy officer and early United States explorer of northwest Alaska.

== Biography ==
Born in Beaufort, South Carolina, Stoney was appointed to the United States Naval Academy from Alabama. He was the first South Carolina native to attend the Naval Academy after the American Civil War, entering on 20 September 1870. Stoney did not graduate until 23 September 1875 and was counted as the last member of the Class of 1875 which was graduated on 20 June 1875.

From 1875 to 1877, Stoney served aboard the USS Swatara in the North Atlantic. After a year at sea, he was commissioned as an ensign on 9 October 1876. From 1877 to 1879, Stoney served aboard the USS Alaska in the Pacific Ocean. From 1879 to 1881, Stoney participated in a Pacific survey by the USS Tuscarora.

=== Arctic exploration ===
After the disappearance of the Jeannette expedition, Stoney volunteered to serve aboard the USS Rodgers. For about two weeks in August–September 1881, he accompanied Master Charles F. Putnam on an exploration of southern Wrangel Island in the Arctic Sea. After the loss of the Rodgers in Saint Lawrence Bay in northeast Siberia, Stoney and other crew members were sheltered by local villagers. Leaving Siberia in May 1882, he returned to San Francisco aboard the USRC Thomas Corwin. Stoney was promoted to lieutenant (junior grade) on 25 June 1883.

After the U.S. Congress appropriated funds to buy gifts for the Siberian villagers who aided the stranded crew of the Rodgers, Stoney returned to Siberia in July 1883 aboard the Thomas Corwin, now commanded by Captain Michael A. Healy, to deliver those gifts. On the return journey, he spent two weeks exploring the delta and lower portion of the Kobuk River in northwest Alaska while the Thomas Corwin completed her Arctic patrol duties. After returning to San Francisco, Stoney submitted a report to Secretary of the Navy William E. Chandler recommending additional exploration.

==== First expedition ====
Receiving approval from Chandler, Stoney organized an 1884 expedition. At the time, the 49-ton merchant schooner Ounalaska was impounded at the Mare Island Navy Yard after her civilian crew had been arrested by Salvadoran authorities for smuggling arms to rebels in El Salvador. Stoney assembled a crew for her consisting of Ensign John L. Purcell, USNA Class of 1879, Dr. Reed, a San Francisco physician serving as ship's apothecary, a gunner's mate and eight Navy seamen. Her cargo included six months of provisions and stores, trade articles for interaction with the Alaskan natives and the 28-foot Navy steam cutter Helena. The USS Ounalaska was commissioned on 18 March 1884 and sailed from San Francisco on 13 April 1884.

Arriving at the Bering Sea in May 1884, Stoney discovered that both Saint Lawrence Bay on the Siberian side and Kotzebue Sound on the Alaskan side were still ice-bound. He was not able to enter the Kotzebue Sound and anchor at the Hotham Inlet until July. Leaving Ensign Purcell in command of the Ounalaska, Stoney then set out to explore the Kobuk River valley in the Helena. He was accompanied by three of his sailors, an interpreter and four Alaskan natives. They spent over a month making observations and collecting samples for the Smithsonian Institution. Returning to the Ounalaska in late August, Stoney gave Ensign Purcell command of the Helena to explore Lake Selawik for a week with two seamen and two natives.

After Purcell's return, the Ounalaska began its return journey on 27 August 1884. Because of low water levels and unfavorable winds, they were not able to maneuver the ship out of Hotham Inlet until 3 September. The process required temporarily transferring some of the cargo to shore, using the Helena as a towboat and obtaining additional aid from the local natives. During the voyage home, the Ounalaska stopped at Saint Lawrence Bay on 13 September so that Stoney could meet with the Siberian villagers again and present some additional gifts. They arrived back in San Francisco on 26 October 1884 and the Ounalaska was decommissioned in November.

==== Second expedition ====
After submitting his report to Secretary of the Navy Chandler, Stoney was authorized to plan a more extensive exploration of the area in 1885. To do so, the expedition would again arrive in July, but this time they would construct a winter camp upriver and then continue their explorations until August 1886. A 60-foot 20-ton flat-bottomed stern-wheel steamboat was constructed at the Mare Island Navy Yard and commissioned as the USS Explorer on 26 April 1885. In addition, a portable steam sawmill was obtained which could be powered by the boilers of either the Helena or the Explorer. Twenty months of provisions were provided, most of which were leftovers from the 1884 Greely relief expedition, plus the means to hire natives and purchase dogs and sleds.

Ensign John L. Purcell was again detailed to accompany Stoney on the Northern Alaska Exploring Expedition. The additional members of the second expedition were Ensign M. L. Reed, Ensign William L. Howard, USNA Class of 1882, Engineer Abram V. Zane, USNA Class of 1874, Navy Surgeon Francis S. Nash and twelve Navy seamen. Zane and Stoney had been crewmates on the ill-fated Rodgers. Nash had served aboard HMS Alert during the Greely relief expedition. Both Howard and Zane would later become Navy rear admirals. The 390-ton two-masted schooner Viking was chartered to transport the men, boats and supplies to Alaska. Final authorization for departure was provided by the new Secretary of Navy William C. Whitney on 1 May 1885, and the Viking sailed from San Francisco two days later.

Having become sick during the voyage, Ensign Purcell was transferred to the southbound whaler Ohio on 7 July 1885. The schooner Viking then arrived at Hotham Inlet on 9 July. The Helena was offloaded, but then the schooner went aground on 11 July. She could not be refloated until 13 July after the Explorer had been offloaded. They then began transferring the expedition supplies ashore. On 17 July, about half of the supplies were taken upstream on the Kobuk River using the two boats. Leaving Ensign Howard in charge of the supplies, the boats returned to Hotham Inlet. The Viking left Kotzebue Sound on 22 July and the remainder of the men and supplies proceeded upriver on 26 July.

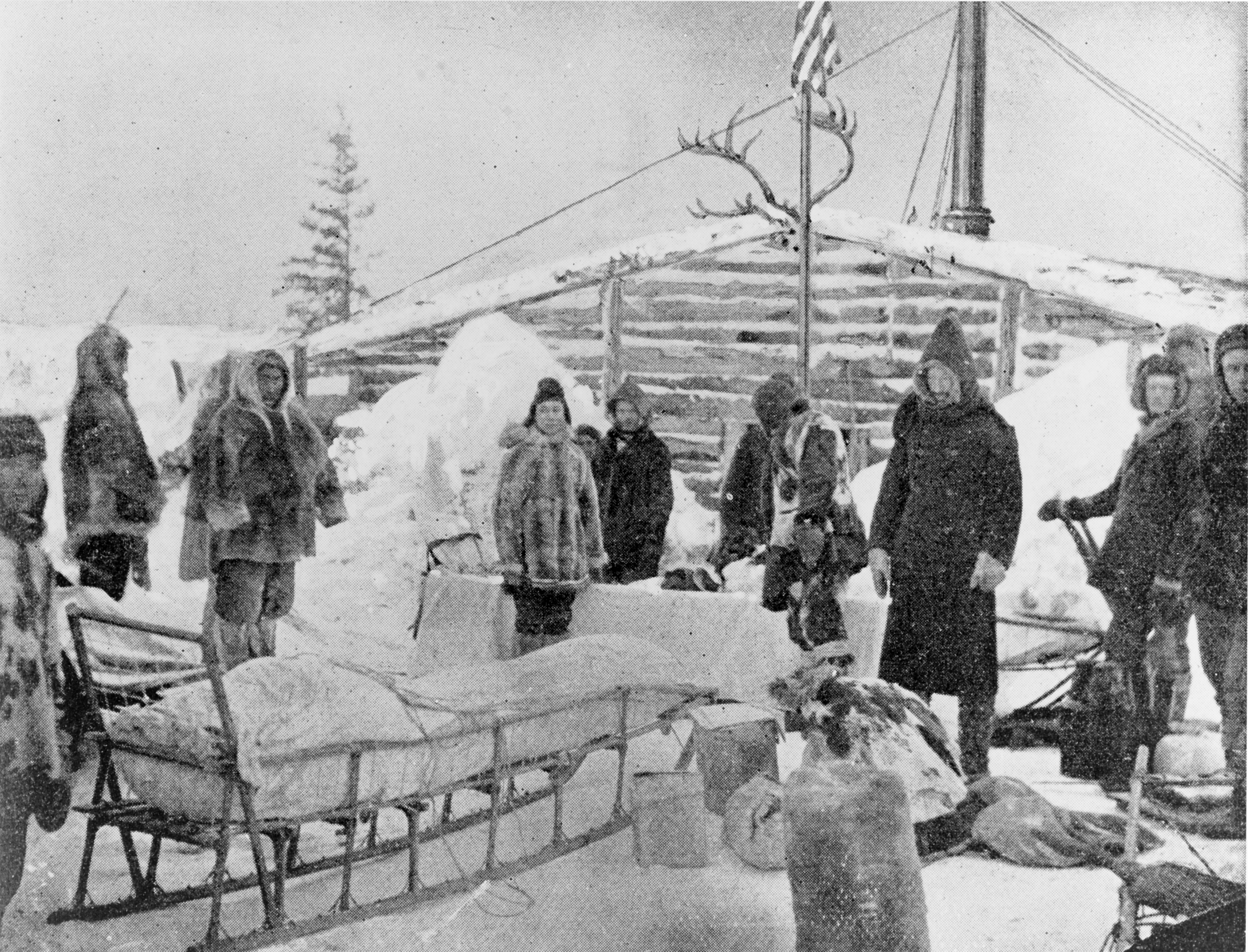
Loading a dogsled in front of the Fort Cosmos log house

On 11 August 1885, Stoney located a suitable place for their winter camp a short distance upstream from present-day Ambler, Alaska. He called the site Fort Cosmos after a club in San Francisco and had a well-insulated log house built. They lived there from 25 September 1885 to 15 June 1886 while exploring in all directions. In addition to the Kobuk River, they explored the Ambler River (a tributary of the Kobuk), the Selawik River valley to the south and the Noatak River valley to the north. From 26 December 1885 to 25 February 1886, A. V. Zane made an overland round trip between Fort Cosmos and St. Michael, Alaska with one sailor, an interpreter and two natives. From 12 April to 16 July 1886, W. L. Howard traveled north from Fort Cosmos to Point Barrow with two sailors, an interpreter and two natives.

The Explorer and Helena arrived back at Hotham Inlet on 7 July 1886. Stoney and his men then continued to explore the lower Noatak River valley, Selawik Lake and the lower Selawik River valley. The USRC Bear arrived at Kotzebue Sound on 20 July under the command of Captain Healy. Arrangements were made for the Bear to pick up Ensign Howard and his party at Point Barrow on 13 August. The Bear then returned to Kotzebue Sound on 23 August to pick up Stoney and the remainder of his men. With the Helena hoisted onboard and the Explorer taken in tow, the Bear departed on 27 August. She arrived at St. Michael the following day. After the Explorer was sold to a local resident for two thousand dollars, the Bear sailed on 4 September and arrived back in San Francisco on 21 October 1886.

=== Later career ===
From 1887 to 1888, Stoney was assigned to the Navy hydrographic office in San Francisco. From 1889 to 1890, he served in the Squadron of Evolution aboard the protected cruiser USS Charleston. Stoney was promoted to lieutenant on 27 June 1889. From 1892 to 1895, he was assigned to the Mare Island Navy Yard. From 1895 to 1897, Stoney served aboard the protected cruiser USS Philadelphia.

During the Spanish–American War, Stoney served aboard the USS Prairie. He was then assigned to the staff of the Naval Academy in 1899 and 1900, during which time he published a two-part account of his Alaskan explorations. Stoney was promoted to lieutenant commander on 3 March 1899. In 1900, he assumed command of the hospital ship USS Solace. In 1902, Stoney was given command of the dispatch vessel USS Dolphin.

Suffering from poor health, Stoney returned to the Naval Academy in June 1903 and was given command of the USS Santee and overall command of all ships at the Naval Academy. He was promoted to commander on 17 June 1904. Stoney died in his cabin aboard the Santee while moored at Annapolis, and his remains were transferred to the receiving vault at Arlington National Cemetery with full military honors on 2 May 1905. He was later buried in Section 1 of the cemetery.

== Legacy ==
Many geographical features in the areas of northwest Alaska explored by Stoney and his men still bear names originally suggested by him.

== Personal ==
On 10 November 1886, Stoney married Kate Duer Babcock (1859–1951) in San Francisco. They had two daughters.
