= Selawik =

Selawik may refer to:

- Selawik, Alaska
- Selawik Lake
- Selawik River
- Selawik National Wildlife Refuge
- Selawik (typeface), a typeface from Microsoft
