= Squirrel River =

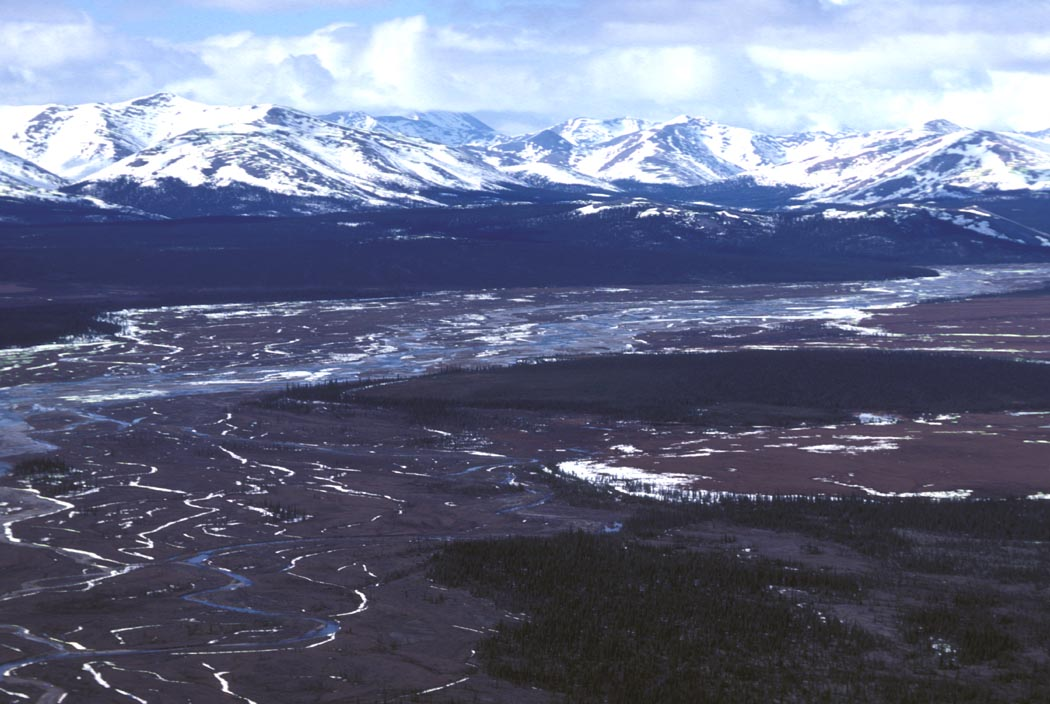
- Squirrel River with Baird Mountains

- Location of the mouth of the Squirrel River in Alaska
- Native name: Siksriktuum Kuuŋa (Inupiaq)

Location
- Country: United States
- State: Alaska
- Borough: Northwest Arctic

Physical characteristics
- Source: Baird Mountains
- Mouth: Kobuk River
  - location: 28 miles (45 km) northwest of Selawik
  - coordinates: 66°59′00″N 160°24′00″W
  - elevation: 30 ft (9.1 m)
- Length: 72 mi (116 km)

The Squirrel River (Iñupiaq: Siksriktuum Kuuŋa, Koyukon: Tleleyh No’) is a 72-mile (116 km) tributary of the Kobuk River in the U.S. state of Alaska. It is a very clear, small arctic river flowing south from the foothills of Baird Mountains to where it meets the Kobuk River in the village of Kiana. From Kiana, the Kobuk flows southwest into Hotham Inlet of Kotzebue Sound on the Chukchi Sea.

The upper segment of the stream runs in a U molded, half-mile wide valley lying between 300-to 400-foot moving slopes. The lower area of stream has a rough track along the north bank that approaches some mining claims on Klery Creek.

== See also ==
- List of rivers of Alaska
