= Jade Mountains =

Mountain range in Alaska, United States

- Ashiganok
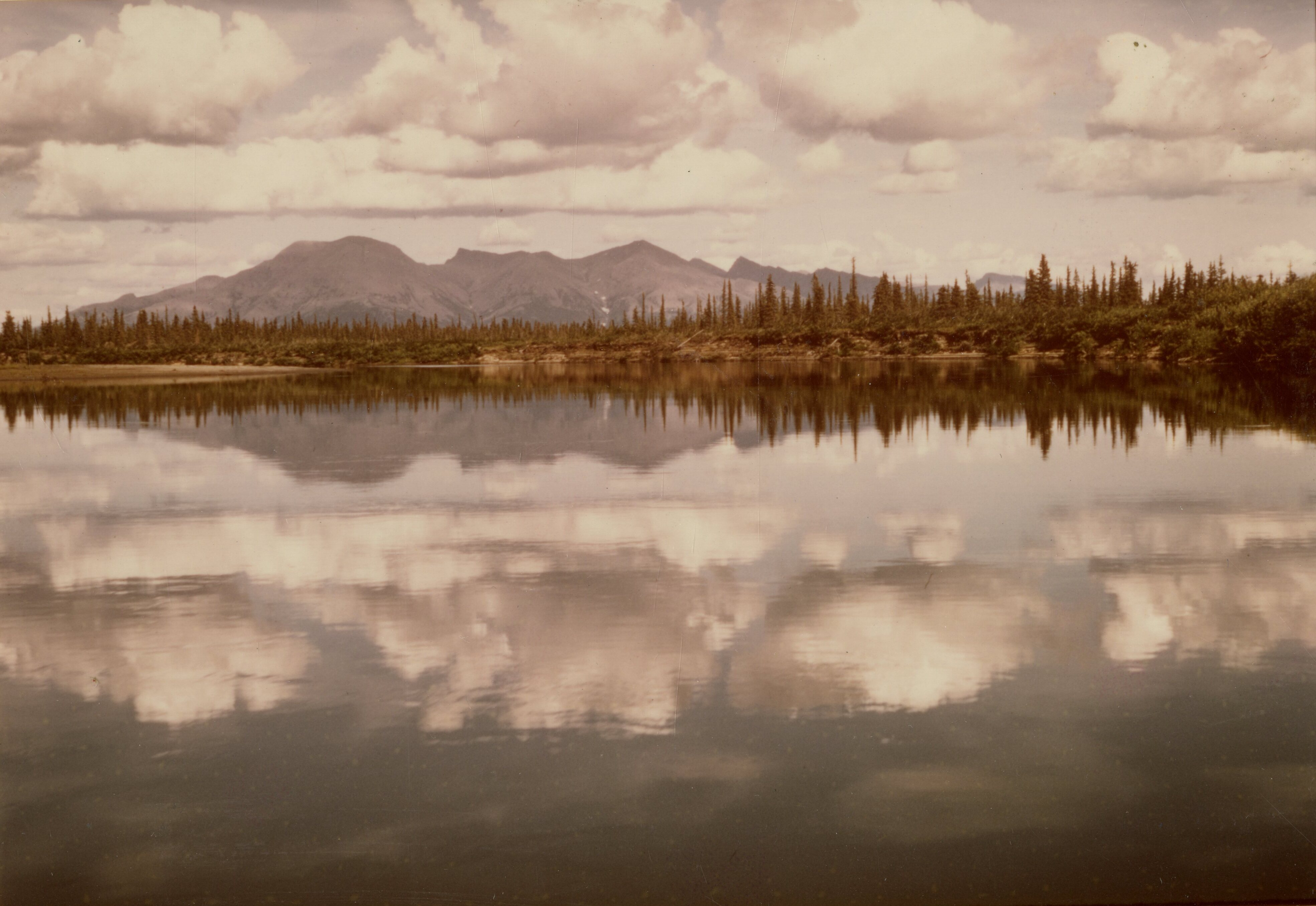
- Akillik River with Jade Mountains in background, 1972

Highest point
- Elevation: 1,844 ft (562 m)

Dimensions
- Length: 11 mi (18 km) NW-SE
- Width: 4 mi (6.4 km)

Geography
- Location within Alaska
- Country: United States
- State: Alaska
- Range coordinates: 67°14′N 158°03′W

The Jade Mountains are a small offshoot range of the larger Baird Mountain Range within the greater Brooks Range in Alaska. They extend 11 miles northwest to southeast, and are 4 miles wide. They run along the eastern border of Kobuk Valley National Park, half inside and half out. They stand between Onion Portage within the park and the village of Ambler.

The range is surrounded by forests of coniferous trees and tundra plants. Rivers and creeks flow through its valleys, supplying the surrounding ecosystem with fresh water.

The mountains have historically been an important source of minerals to the Iñupiaq people. Pre-contact, jade was one of the strongest materials available and was used in the making of a number of necessary items, including tools, weaponry, knives, and beads.

The mountains were first named by George Morse Stoney after his visit there in 1884. He likely named the mountains after the samples of jade he obtained for the Smithsonian Institution during his visit.
