= Kobuk =

Kobuk may refer to:

- Kobuk, Alaska
- Kobuk River, in Alaska
- Kobuk Valley National Park in Alaska
