= Kiana, Alaska =

City in Alaska, United States

Kiana Katyaaq
- City
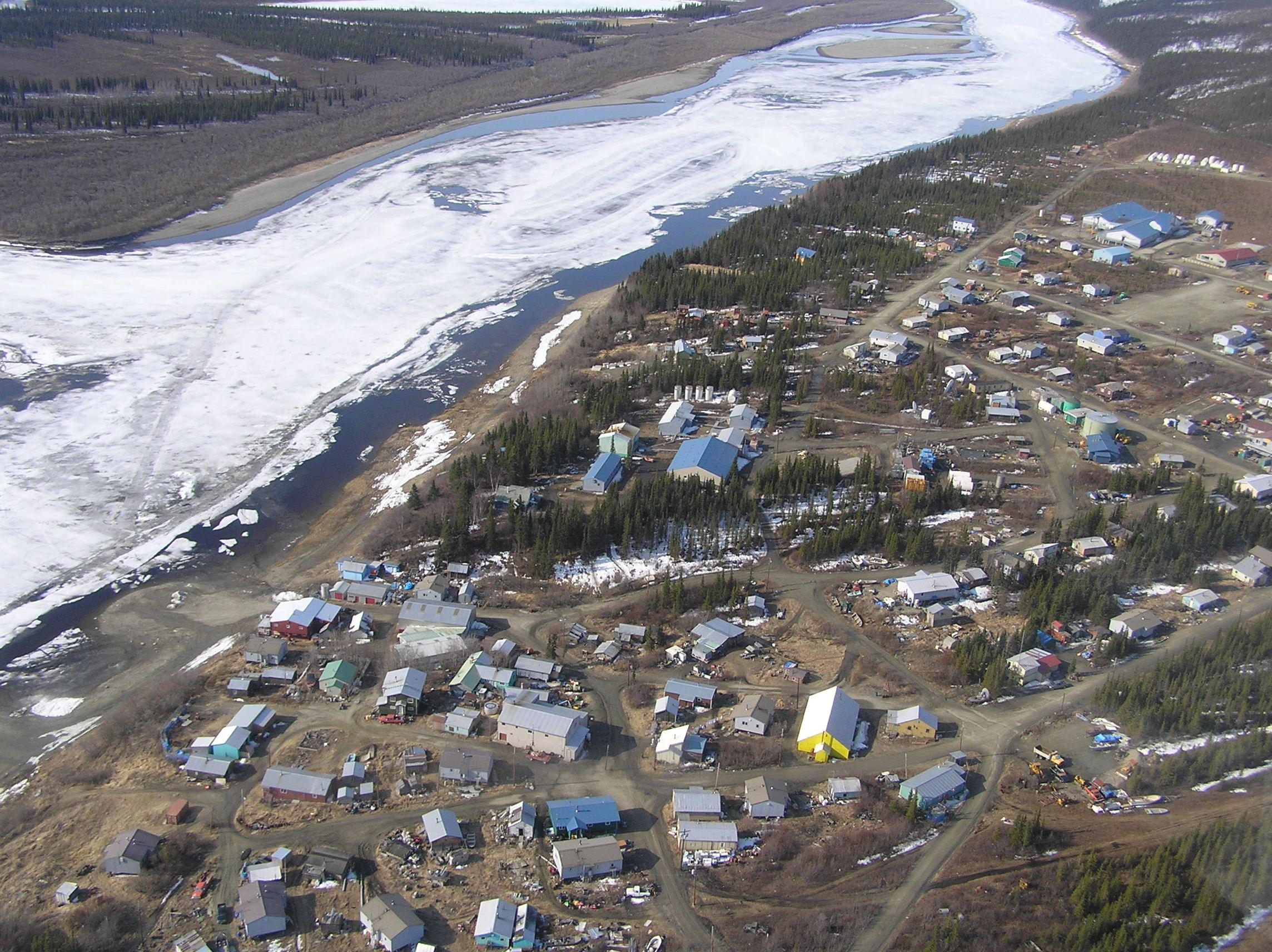
- Aerial view of Kiana and the Kobuk River

- Location in Northwest Arctic Borough and the state of Alaska
- Coordinates: 66°58′18″N 160°25′49″W
- Country: United States
- State: Alaska
- Borough: Northwest Arctic
- Incorporated: June 30, 1964

Government
  - Mayor: Brad M. Reich
  - State senator: Donny Olson (D)
  - State rep.: Robyn Burke (D)

Area
  - Total: 0.19 sq mi (0.49 km^{2})
  - Land: 0.19 sq mi (0.49 km^{2})
  - Water: 0 sq mi (0.00 km^{2})
- Elevation: 92 ft (28 m)

Population (2020)
  - Total: 447
  - Density: 2,376.7/sq mi (917.66/km^{2})
- Time zone: UTC−9 (Alaska (AKST))
  - Summer (DST): UTC−8 (AKDT)
- ZIP code: 99749
- Area code: 907
- FIPS code: 02-39300
- GNIS feature ID: 1413311

Kiana (Inupiaq: Katyaak or Katyaaq) is a city in Northwest Arctic Borough, Alaska, United States. As of the 2020 census, Kiana had a population of 447.

== History ==
=== Before contact ===
Kiana, meaning where three rivers meet, was founded several centuries ago. Before Kiana became a village, the Inupiat tended to travel with certain animal herds; constantly hunting for meat and furs.

In the 1800s, the Inupiaqs of Kiana used to live along the Kobuk River. Throughout the year the villagers hunted and fished near their houses. They moved to an area where there was an abundance of animals and fish. The Inupiaqs lived in sod houses as they followed game.

When someone died inside the house they abandoned it, believing they would catch a contagious disease. Instead of building coffins or digging graves, the villagers wrapped the bodies of the deceased in cloths; they put poles in the cloths making the shape of a teepee.

Archaeological studies have been done on the local site 'Igliqtiqsiugvigruaq' (Swift Water Place) which was inhabited by the ancestors of the present day residents of Kiana from 1790 to 1810. The town consisted of burrowed homes connected by tunnels.

=== Early 20th century ===
The first white people arrived from the south with boats in 1898 and changed the way of life. They settled in what is now Kiana. More white people came in 1901 and 1902 and started building houses. Inupiaq women moved to them and married the men.

Archaeologists have discovered a pre-contact Inupiaq village near Kiana. From carbon dating, the archaeologists discovered the village was from the late 1700s to the early 1800s. After more digging was done, they found that some of the houses they excavated were connected with tunnels and passageways. The average house size in the village was about the size of typical one-roomed cabins. Some of the artifacts that were found include metal fragments and shards, as well as glass beads.

Kiana is the central village of the Kobuk river, for Kowagmiut Inupiaq Eskimos. Kiana became known to the Federal Government after a population increase, eventually making the town in to a city, in the year 1915. A United States Post Office was founded in the year 1964.

Before the post office was built, mail came only once a month. The mail transportation method was mainly by dogsled or by walking from one village to another. During that time, Kiana became a key supply city for coal and gold miners who were posted along the Squirrel River. The Blankenship Trading Post was managed by Walter Blankenship, and later by Robinson Blankenship and Ruth Blankenship Sandvik. The trading post was the only store with goods such as flour, salt, carbonated beverages, coffee, tea, sugar, and fruit, both dried and canned.

== Language ==
The first villages in the region to start teaching the Inupiaq language in public school were Ambler, Shungnak, and Kobuk. Noorvik and the other villages around the region began teaching it as well. Viola Barr and Rosaline Jackson were the first people in Kiana to teach Inupiaq language in a classroom in 1971. Before white people came to the region, the children of Kiana grew up speaking the Inupiaq language. Most Kiana students and adults do not know how to read, write, or speak the language. The region is trying to get more people to speak the language so many more townspeople will be able to speak Inupiaq. Rosetta Stone and the Inupiaq Language Commission help with the effort.

== Geography ==
Kiana is located at 66°58′18″N 160°25′49″W (66.971720, -160.430168). According to the United States Census Bureau, the city has a total area of 0.2 square miles (0.52 km^{2}), all of it land.

The village of Kiana is located where rivers meet: the Squirrel River, Kobuk River as well as big/small channel rivers. Kiana is in the Northwestern Alaska, 30 miles north of the Arctic Circle, and 57 air miles east of Kotzebue.

== Climate ==
In Kiana, there are frequent storms and extreme temperature swings. There is also evidence of climate change occurring in the past 50 years. Evidence of rising temperatures each month, and increased precipitation (except July) has also been recorded.

The snowfall is significant with about 60 inches per year and the rainfall is 16 inches on average. The Kobuk River is navigable by boat from May to October; it is frozen for the remainder of the year.

A weak tornado briefly touched down in Kiana on August 26, 1976, making the city the site of the northernmost recorded tornado.

Climate data for Kiana, Alaska
Month	Jan	Feb	Mar	Apr	May	Jun	Jul	Aug	Sep	Oct	Nov	Dec	Year
Record high °F (°C)	40 (4)	38 (3)	48 (9)	62 (17)	82 (28)	92 (33)	91 (33)	91 (33)	74 (23)	62 (17)	41 (5)	42 (6)	92 (33)
Mean daily maximum °F (°C)	4.6 (−15.2)	10.3 (−12.1)	16.1 (−8.8)	33.4 (0.8)	51.5 (10.8)	65.4 (18.6)	67.5 (19.7)	61.3 (16.3)	50.1 (10.1)	31.0 (−0.6)	11.3 (−11.5)	6.7 (−14.1)	34.1 (1.2)
Daily mean °F (°C)	−2.3 (−19.1)	2.3 (−16.5)	6.7 (−14.1)	23.6 (−4.7)	41.5 (5.3)	54.9 (12.7)	58.2 (14.6)	52.4 (11.3)	41.9 (5.5)	25.0 (−3.9)	5.9 (−14.5)	0.3 (−17.6)	25.9 (−3.4)
Mean daily minimum °F (°C)	−8.6 (−22.6)	−5.1 (−20.6)	−3.6 (−19.8)	13.6 (−10.2)	31.5 (−0.3)	44.3 (6.8)	48.8 (9.3)	43.5 (6.4)	33.6 (0.9)	18.9 (−7.3)	−0.6 (−18.1)	−6.1 (−21.2)	17.5 (−8.1)
Record low °F (°C)	−58 (−50)	−54 (−48)	−51 (−46)	−21 (−29)	−8 (−22)	28 (−2)	30 (−1)	22 (−6)	6 (−14)	−19 (−28)	−39 (−39)	−52 (−47)	−58 (−50)
Average precipitation inches (mm)	1.55 (39)	—	—	—	0.37 (9.4)	—	—	—	7.91 (201)	4.33 (110)	1.16 (29)	0.44 (11)	—
Average snowfall inches (cm)	—	—	—	—	0.1 (0.25)	—	—	—	—	—	—	—	—

== Demographics ==
Historical population
Census	Pop.	Note	%±
1920	98		—
1930	115		17.3%
1940	167		45.2%
1950	181		8.4%
1960	253		39.8%
1970	278		9.9%
1980	345		24.1%
1990	385		11.6%
2000	388		0.8%
2010	361		−7.0%
2020	447		23.8%
U.S. Decennial Census

Kiana first appeared on the 1920 U.S. Census as an unincorporated native village. It formally incorporated in 1964.

=== 2020 census ===
As of the 2020 census, Kiana had a population of 447. The median age was 24.9 years. 35.6% of residents were under the age of 18 and 7.4% of residents were 65 years of age or older. For every 100 females there were 112.9 males, and for every 100 females age 18 and over there were 128.6 males age 18 and over.

0.0% of residents lived in urban areas, while 100.0% lived in rural areas.

There were 108 households in Kiana, of which 58.3% had children under the age of 18 living in them. Of all households, 26.9% were married-couple households, 21.3% were households with a male householder and no spouse or partner present, and 29.6% were households with a female householder and no spouse or partner present. About 16.7% of all households were made up of individuals and 5.6% had someone living alone who was 65 years of age or older.

There were 135 housing units, of which 20.0% were vacant. The homeowner vacancy rate was 0.0% and the rental vacancy rate was 18.9%.

Racial composition as of the 2020 census
Race	Number	Percent
White	21	4.7%
Black or African American	1	0.2%
American Indian and Alaska Native	399	89.3%
Asian	2	0.4%
Native Hawaiian and Other Pacific Islander	0	0.0%
Some other race	0	0.0%
Two or more races	24	5.4%
Hispanic or Latino (of any race)	1	0.2%

=== 2013 estimates ===
As of 2013, there were 77 families in the city, and households averaged 3 people.

=== 2011 income ===
The median income for a household in 2011, was $39,688, and the median income for a family was $41,667. Males had a median income of $31,250 versus $35,938 for females. The per capita income for the city was $11,534. About 5.6% of families and 11.2% of the population were below the poverty line, including 9.1% of those under age 18 and 12.5% of those age 65 or over.

== Politics ==
Kiana has a city administrator who is responsible for the day-to-day operations of the facilities and to carry out the vision and the mission that is set forth by the City Council and the Mayor who are both elected by the citizens. The mayor's responsibility is to help set the focus of the Council.

Tom Cyrus was mayor of Kiana for 7 years, from 2003 to 2010. During that time, the city and traditional council worked closely. They chose to merge the two governments and formed a joint council since they were working with similar visions. The merged organization of governments held joint council meetings and planning sessions. They had one executive director, one accountant, and a city clerk. All administrative positions were moved into one building and they streamlined costs by not duplicating services. At that time, there was limited funding available to municipal governments and there were more opportunities for money through BIA funds and tribal government. In 2009, the goals began to change and it was decided to separate the two governments, with the goal of making the city and traditional governments financially solvent again.

Some of the issues that the mayor deals with include looking for funding, supervising the water and sewer plant, managing the village power, and dealing with wildlife in the community. The mayor also has to assist the council and community with long range planning.

Kiana's current mayor, Brad Reich, became mayor when Tom Cyrus resigned in 2009. The full resignation took a year to go into effect and Reich become mayor.

== Education ==
The Kiana School, operated by the Northwest Arctic Borough School District, serves the community. As of 2017 it has 123 students, with Alaska natives making up 97% of the student body.

== Transportation ==
There are several types and uses of transportation in and around Kiana which include travel over land and water. Types of land transportation used by the people in Kiana are all terrain vehicles, cars, trucks, and snow machines. They are used for getting around the village and just riding around.

Some vehicles are used to travel between villages. In the winter, an ice road is usually plowed or formed on the Kobuk River from Kiana to Noorvik; it extends all the way to Kotzebue. In the summer, the people of Kiana use the same routes on motor boats to get to other villages.

In all seasons, people use bush airplanes to get to all other villages in the region. Bob Baker Memorial Airport is located one mile from the city. Bering Air and Ravn Air provide service to Kotzebue and other locations. The barge system which services Kiana is Crowley Marine Services. CMS goes to Kiana every summer, bringing gas, fuel, and other products. Store owners use large boats to ship goods upriver.

The costs for transportation are very significant. For example, buying tickets on a bush plane and fuel costs are high. Bering Air charges $324 for round trip fare to Kotzebue, and $180 round trip to Noorvik. Ravn Air tickets are $240 round trip to Kotzebue and $160 round both ways to Noorvik. Gas prices vary. At the Kiana City Office, it costs $7.21 including tax for a gallon of gas. At Lee's Sea Air (the store in Kiana), it's $12 for a gallon.
