= Kobuk River =

River in the U.S. state of Alaska

Kobuk Kooak, Kowak, Kubuk, Kuwuk, Kuvuk, Putnam
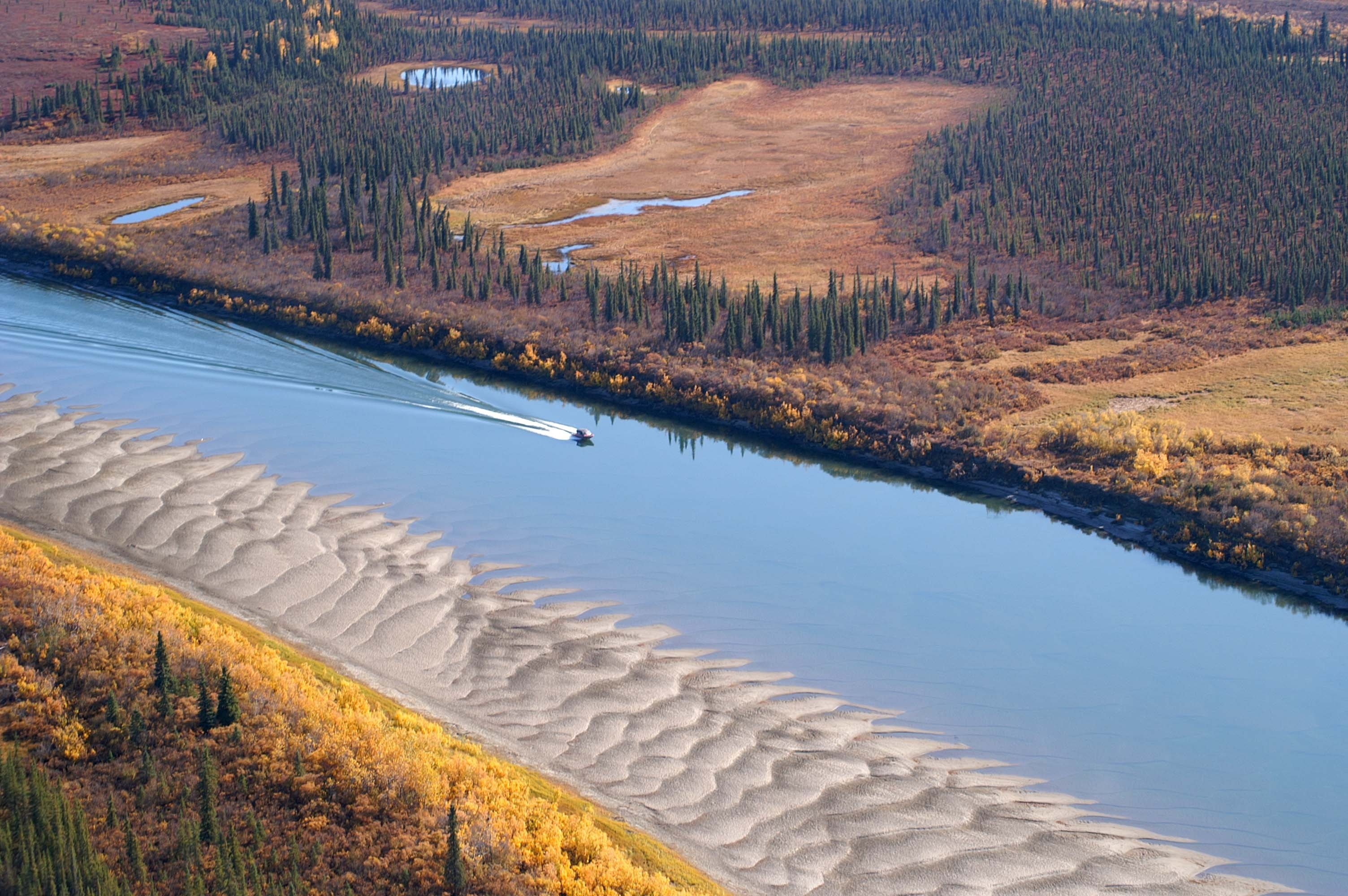
- Aerial view of a motorboat on the Kobuk River

- Location of the mouth of the Kobuk River in Alaska
- Native name: Kuuvak (Inupiaq)

Location
- Country: United States
- State: Alaska

Physical characteristics
- Source: Endicott Mountains
  - coordinates: 67°17′59″N 154°23′41″W
- 2nd source: Walker Lake
- Mouth: Kobuk Delta
- Length: 280 mi (451 km)
- Basin size: 12,310 sq mi (31,880 km^{2})
- Discharge
  - location: Hotham Inlet
  - average: 10,000 cu ft/s (283 m^{3}/s)
  - minimum: 1,400 cu ft/s (40 m^{3}/s)
  - maximum: 110,000 cu ft/s (3,000 m^{3}/s)

Basin features
- Tributaries
  - left: Squirrel River, Tutsuksuk River
  - right: Salmon River, Adillik River

National Wild and Scenic River
- Type: Wild 110.0 miles (177.0 km)
- Designated: December 2, 1980

The Kobuk River (Iñupiaq: Kuuvak; Koyukon: Hʉlghaatno), also known by the names Kooak, Kowak, Kubuk, Kuvuk, and Putnam, is a river located in the Arctic region of northwestern Alaska in the United States. It is approximately 280 miles (451 km) long. Draining a basin with an area of 12,300 square miles (32,000 km^{2}), the Kobuk River is among the largest rivers in northwest Alaska, with widths of up to 1,500 feet (460 m) and flows reaching speeds of 3–5 miles per hour (5–8 km per hour) in its lower and middle reaches. The elevation of the Kobuk River Basin is on average 1,300 feet (400 m), ranging from sea level at its mouth on the Bering Sea to 8,276 feet (2,523 m) on the summit of Mount Igikpak.

Topography along the river includes low, rolling mountains, plains and lowlands, moderately high rugged mountainous land, and some gently sloped plateaus and highlands. The river contains an exceptional population of sheefish (Stenodus Nelma), a large predatory whitefish within the salmon family, which spawns in the river's upper reaches during the autumn. A portion of the vast Western Arctic caribou herd utilize the Kobuk River valley as winter range.

== Course ==
It is commonly assumed that the Kobuk River issues from Walker Lake, but the headwaters of the river are actually to the east of Walker Lake in the Endicott Mountains within Gates of the Arctic National Park and Preserve, just north of the Arctic Circle. The river flows briefly south, descending from the mountains through two spectacular canyons (Upper and Lower Kobuk Canyon), then generally west along the southern flank of the western Brooks Range in a broad wetlands valley. In the valley it passes a connected community of inland native villages, including Kobuk, Shungnak, and Ambler, where it receives the Ambler River.

In the river's lower reaches, where it passes between the Baird Mountains and Waring Mountains, it traverses Kobuk Valley National Park, the location of the 25 square miles (65 km^{2}) Kobuk Sand Dunes. It then passes Kiana, entering its broad delta approximately 10 miles (16 km) southwest of town. The Kobuk empties into the Hotham Inlet of Kotzebue Sound approximately 30 miles (48 km) southeast of the city of Kotzebue.

== History ==
The Kobuk's Inuit name, Kuuvak, means "great river". It was first transcribed by John Simpson in 1850 as "Kowuk". The river was explored by Lt. G. M. Stoney, USN, in 1883–1886, who wrote the name "Ku-buck" but proposed that it be called "Putnam" in honor of Master Charles Putnam, USN, an officer of the Rodgers, who was carried to sea on the ice and lost in 1882. Lt. J. C. Cantwell, USRCS, also explored the river in 1884 and 1885 and spelled the name "Koowak" on his map and "Kowak" in his text. Ivan Petroff spelled the river name "Kooak" in 1880, and W. H. Dall spelled it "Kowk" in 1870. Lt. H. T. Allen, US Army, transcribed the Koyukon Indian name for the river in 1885, which he spelled "Holooatna" and "Holoatna."

Native peoples have hunted, fished, and lived along the Kobuk for at least 12,500 years and it has long been an important transportation route for inland peoples. In 1898, the river was the scene of a brief gold rush called the Kobuk River Stampede, which involved about 2,000 prospectors in total. Hearing of gold along the Kobuk and its tributaries, miners set out from Seattle and San Francisco on ships to reach the mouth of the Kobuk. Upon arrival they were informed by native people that it was a scam, and only about 800 traveled upriver. The result was that little or no gold was found, and only on a few tributaries of the river. In 1980 the United States Congress designated 110 miles (177 km) of the river downstream from Walker Lake as the Kobuk Wild and Scenic River, part of the National Wild and Scenic Rivers System. The river is considered an outstanding destination for recreational floating.

== Climate ==
The Kobuk River Basin is located just north of the Arctic Circle and has a continental climate. The summers are short and warm, while winters are long and cold. The mean annual temperature in the middle and upper portions of the Kobuk Valley is -6 °C, and the mean temperature in July is 15 °C. An average of 21 inches (53 cm) of precipitation falls in the basin. However, actual precipitation can range from 15 to 40 inches (40–100 cm), with greater amounts falling in the upper reaches of the river basin.

The Kobuk River Basin is very sensitive to changes in climate. Arctic climates have warmed at approximately twice the global rate in the last several decades. Records of air temperature from 1961 to 1990 logged at the latitudes of the Kobuk River show a warming trend of about 1.4 °F (0.78 °C) per decade. The warming has been strongest in the winter and spring months. Climate change is presently considered the most severe environmental stress in the Kobuk River Basin and throughout Alaska.

As a specific example, climate change will cause widespread thawing of permafrost in the discontinuous zone and significant changes in the continuous zone. Thawing permafrost can lead to a landscape of irregular depressions (thermokarst) due to subsiding soils. This can alter drainage patterns and even change the course of streams, whereas other areas could become swamp-like. In addition, slope stability will decrease and permafrost degradation could lead to erosion of river banks resulting in an increase in sediment transport by the rivers. These physical changes will impact nutrient cycling and biological processes within the basin as well.

== Geology and soils ==
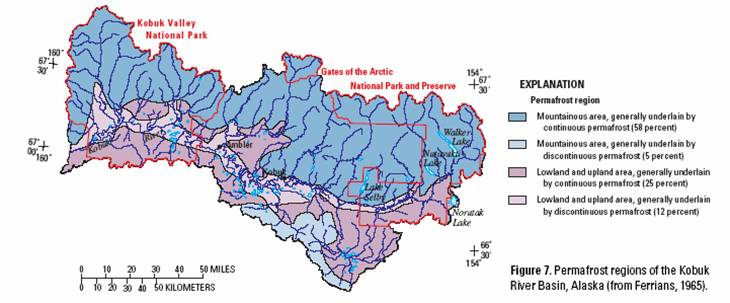
Permafrost regions along the Kobuk River

Permafrost regions along the Kobuk River are shown in the accompanying figure.

=== Geomorphology ===
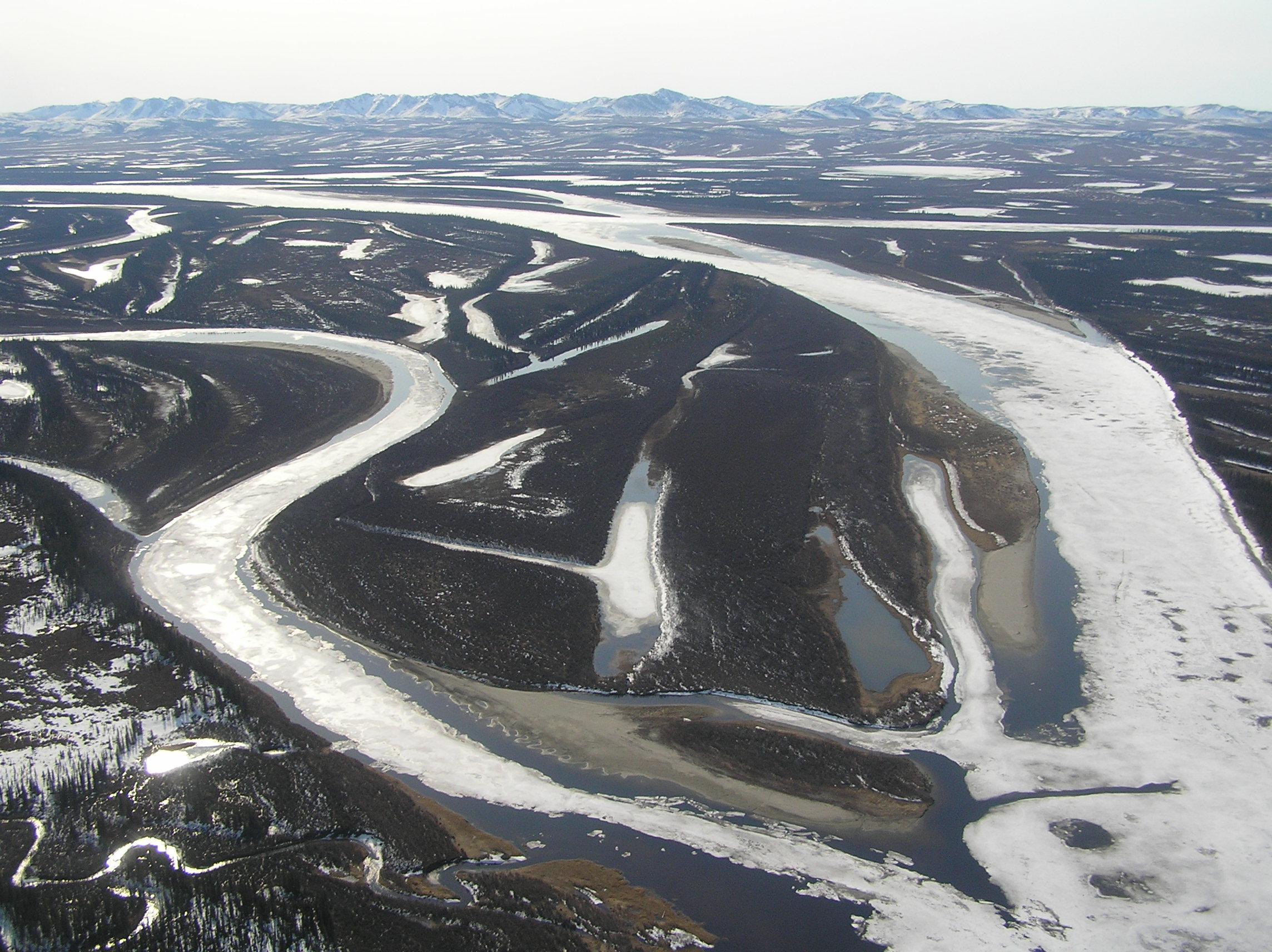
Kobuk River west of Kiana, Alaska

The Kobuk River is a periglacial river, fed by a remnant glacial lake (Walker Lake) and mountain snowmelt in the Brooks Range. It cuts a channel through a landscape otherwise dominated by permafrost. The Kobuk's current form and structure is a direct result of several stages of erosion and channel formation following the last glacial retreat.

As the glacier first retreated and melted, large amounts of highly erodible, fine-grained sediment dropped out in relatively high mountain valleys. The availability of this fine-grained, loose sediment combined with a high gradient to turn a newly forming Kobuk River into a fast-working sediment transport system. The river picked up glacial till from its upper reaches and transported it downstream until the gradient diminished. When the river encountered flatter ground, it deposited its sediment load resulting in the creation of broad, flat floodplains, alluvial fans, and meander bends through aggradation.

After the first stage of aggradation and sediment transport, the Kobuk began a new phase of erosion and landform development. The river exhausted its supply of easily erodible sediment upstream, thus decreasing its sediment load and increasing its load carrying capacity downstream. With more capacity downstream, the river began to incise into the alluvial fan it previously created, moving sediment stored for a long time on its original floodplains to newer floodplains even further downstream.

Further down in the Kobuk watershed, the river worked in concert with the wind to create one of the more famous landforms in Alaska: the Kobuk Dunes. These large sand dunes are the modern ancestor of alluvial deposits that became shaped and dominated by an exchange of aeolian and fluvial processes. In moister climates, the river has more water and thus more power, and cuts down through a sandy bed. In times of drier climate, wind dominates and blows a lot of sediment into a weaker fluvial system, leading to aggradation and floodplain re-distribution.

Currently, the Kobuk River in its middle and lower reaches is an anastomosing stream, with several braided channels in places, wide migrating meander bends, and oxbow lakes. It is controlled by yearly cycles of freeze and thaw, much like its surrounding landscape. For six months of the year, the river is largely still, frozen on top by a thick layer of ice. In the spring, warmer temperatures cause this ice to begin to melt. But the resulting process is not gradual. Rather, the pressure of melting ice from upstream builds up upon ice "dams" in the river's channel, eventually causing an "ice break-up" event, in which a flood of ice and water moves powerfully downstream.

These annual spring break-up events have several important consequences. First, the river has deeply undercut and eroded banks, caused by large, fast-moving chunks of ice carving out the river's channel before it begins spilling out onto its floodplain, which averages between 1 and 6 miles (1.6 and 9.7 km) wide except at confluences with major tributaries. Second, the river moves laterally very quickly and dramatically, re-inventing side channels every year as its secondary streams become drowned in each yearly flood by an overwhelming amount of sediment. Lastly, since the river is surrounded mostly by permafrost and because during the spring break-up event there are still large parts of frozen ground close to its banks, floods often transport large amounts of fine sediment across broad expanses of floodplain in thin sheets of water that slide easily across the frozen ground. These characteristics also translate into a relatively variable habitat for the Kobuk's native species.

Farthest west, the Kobuk empties into Hotham Inlet, the easterly arm of Kotzebue Sound. During recent geologic times, however, when sea level was lower, the Noatak, Kobuk, and Selawik Rivers were joined. Now, they have separate deltas with many lakes and swamps and intricately webbed channel systems. The deltas are composed primarily of silt, sand, and gravel.

== Surface water and hydrology ==
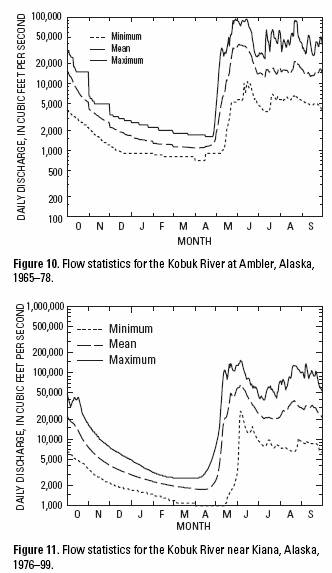

The Kobuk River is ice-covered for an average of six months of the year and in general, late October to late May is a period of relatively low flow. Annually, the hydrograph reflects two flood peaks: the first is associated with spring break-up and the second, a lesser peak, is associated with late summer precipitation. As the snowpack begins to melt toward the end of May, flow in the Kobuk River increases with most of the runoff occurring during June. Flow during the summer (July through September) is dominated by variable precipitation events.

Most of the major tributaries of the Kobuk River flow from the north, draining the mountains in the southern Brooks Range. From east to west, these include the Reed River, Beaver Creek, Mauneluk River, Kogoluktuk River, Shungnak River, Ambler River, Akillik River, Tutuksuk River, Salmon River, and Squirrel River. Within Kobuk Valley National Park are the Kallarichuk, Kaliguricheark, and Adillik rivers. All of their headwaters are in the Baird Mountains. The major tributaries flowing north from the Waring Mountains are the Pah River, Pick River, and Niaktuvik Creek. The Pah River drains a lowland area of the basin. Most major tributaries draining high-relief areas have higher unit runoff than tributaries draining the lower-relief areas.

Walker Lake is at an altitude of 194 metres (636 ft) in the headwaters of the Kobuk River. Other surface water features within the basin include Lake Selby, Nutuvukti Lake, and Norutak Lake. Additionally, numerous small lakes and ponds occur in the lowlands along the river, some formed as detached oxbows of the meandering river and others formed where permafrost has melted and caused depressions.

Flow records are available from USGS monitoring stations at Ambler and Kiana. Average annual flow for the Kobuk River at Ambler ranged from 5,839 cubic feet per second (165.3 m^{3}/s) to 14,890 cubic feet per second (422 m^{3}/s) over the period of record from 1966 to 1978, with peak discharge ranging between 30,000 cubic feet per second (850 m^{3}/s) and 95,000 cubic feet per second (2,700 m^{3}/s). Near Kiana, average annual flow ranged from 10,020 cubic feet per second (284 m^{3}/s) to 24,960 cubic feet per second (707 m^{3}/s) for the period from 1977 to 1999, with peaks of 45,000 cubic feet per second (1,300 m^{3}/s) to 161,000 cubic feet per second (4,600 m^{3}/s). Peak flows can result from large volumes of water released when ice jams fail. Flow records are also available for Dahl Creek, a tributary of the Kobuk River with a confluence near the town of Kobuk.

== See also ==
- List of rivers of Alaska
- List of National Wild and Scenic Rivers
- Kobuk River Stampede
