= Walker Lake (Northwest Arctic, Alaska) =

Lake in the state of Alaska, United States

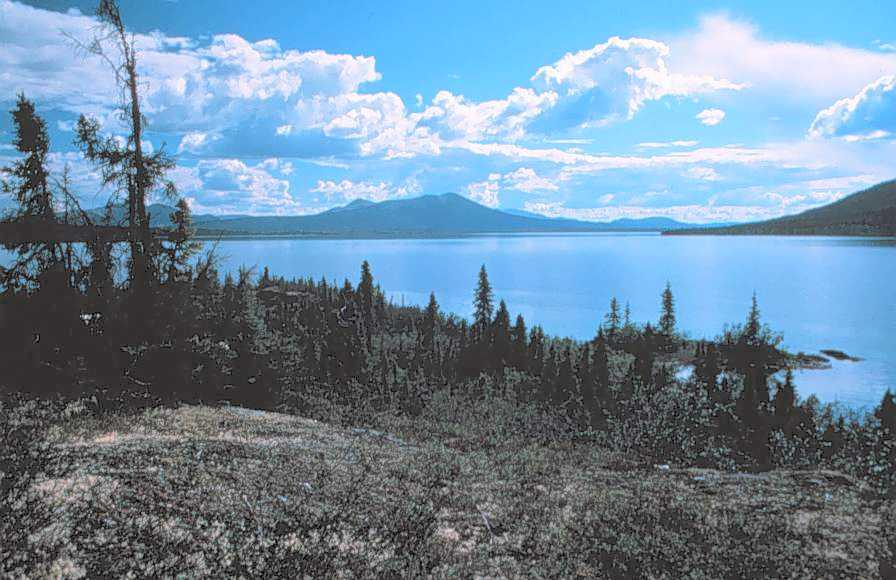

- Location within Alaska Location within North America
- Location: Northwest Arctic Borough, Alaska, United States
- Coordinates: 67°07′36″N 154°21′47″W
- Primary outflows: Kobuk River
- Basin countries: United States
- Surface elevation: 679 feet (207 m)

U.S. National Natural Landmark
- Designated: 1968

Walker Lake (Iñupiaq: Qalugluktuaq; Denaakk'e: Taah K'ehoolaanh) is the source of the Kobuk River in northwestern Alaska (emptying into Kotzebue Sound). The lake is located near the easternmost part of Northwest Arctic Borough, deep in the remote interior of Alaska, on the South slope of the Brooks Range, and is approximately 1 mile by 14 miles. Explored during an expedition led by John C. Cantwell in 1885, under the authority of the Revenue Marine. Also known as "Big Fish Lake", Inupiaq legend in the area told of giant, ferocious fish that inhabited the waters. An attempt by a native with the Cantwell expedition to catch one of these giant fish involved a hook made of an entire set of reindeer antlers baited with a whole goose.

In 1968, Walker Lake, was designated as a National Natural Landmark by the National Park Service. It was later incorporated into Gates of the Arctic National Park.

== See also ==
- List of lakes of Alaska
- List of National Natural Landmarks
- List of reported lake monsters
