= Hotham Inlet =

Coordinates: 66°49′11″N 161°57′54″W

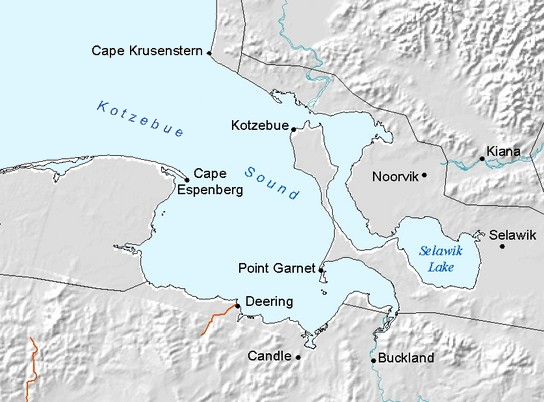
Map showing Selawik Lake that feeds into the Hotham Inlet and Kotzebue Sound

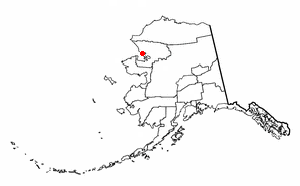
Location of the Hotham Inlet in Alaska

Hotham Inlet, also known as Kobuk Lake, is an arm of Kotzebue Sound on the northwestern coast of the U.S. state of Alaska. It is 50 miles (80 km) long and 5–20 miles (8–32 km) wide. The inlet is the outlet of the Kobuk and Selawik Rivers and it is bounded on the southwest by the Baldwin Peninsula.

This inlet was named in 1826 by Royal Navy Captain Frederick William Beechey after Sir Henry Hotham, one of the lords of the British Admiralty.

== Geography ==
The eastern coast of Kotzebue Sound is broken by many deep embayments and inlets. The largest of these—Hotham Inlet—is a long, irregular-shaped body of water, cut off from the sound by a long, narrow neck of land. The largest tributaries of Kotzebue Sound—the Noatak, the Kobuk, and the Selawik—flow into the inlet.

The Selawik, the southernmost of the three, empties into Selawik Lake, which is connected by a narrow water passage with the head of Hotham Inlet. This lake or lagoon undoubtedly owes its origin to the building out of the delta of the Kobuk River, which has thus cut off a part of the former extension of the inlet. Several smaller bodies of water to the east are connected by tidal" channels with the larger basin.

The eastern shore of Hotham Inlet is formed by the broad delta of the Kobuk' River, whose headwaters have not been explored, but are known to lie about 200 miles due east of Hotham Inlet, in a high mountain mass near latitude 67°, longitude 155°. In the same region are probably the sources of the Alatna, which flows south into the Koyukuk; of the Noatak, which flows west into Kotzebue Sound, and of a branch of the Colville, which flows northerly into the Arctic Ocean. The general trend of the valley of the Kobuk is east and west with, however, a number of broad bends. The lower half of the valley is characterized by a broad, flat depression, while the upper half, made up of a series of basins and connecting canyons.

Near the one hundred and sixty-first meridian the north wall of the Kobuk valley recedes and swings around the head of the eastern arm of Hotham Inlet, while the mountain range which forms the south wall terminates abruptly at the delta, a featureless plain, across which the river sends its drainage to the inlet through innumerable tortuous channels. The delta is about 30 miles square, and is bounded on the south by Selawik Lake and on the west and north by Hotham Inlet. It is traversed by a maze of intricate waterways, with numerous lakes and lagoons, is being rapidly extended seaward, and is constantly encroaching on the shallow waters of Hotham Inlet.

The Noatak is the third and probably the largest of the three rivers which flow into Kotzebue Sound from the east. Its head lies near the sources of the Colville and Kobuk, and its general course is westerly until it approaches within 30 miles of the coast, where it bends sharply and reaches the sea at the north end of Hotham Inlet by a general southerly course.

== Bibliography ==
- Brooks, Alfred Hulse; Abbe, Cleveland; Goode, Richard Urquhart (1906). The Geography and Geology of Alaska: A Summary of Existing Knowledge (Public domain ed.). U.S. Government Printing Office.

== Sources ==
- U.S. Geological Survey Geographic Names Information System: Hotham Inlet
