= Selawik Lake =

Lake in the state of Alaska, United States

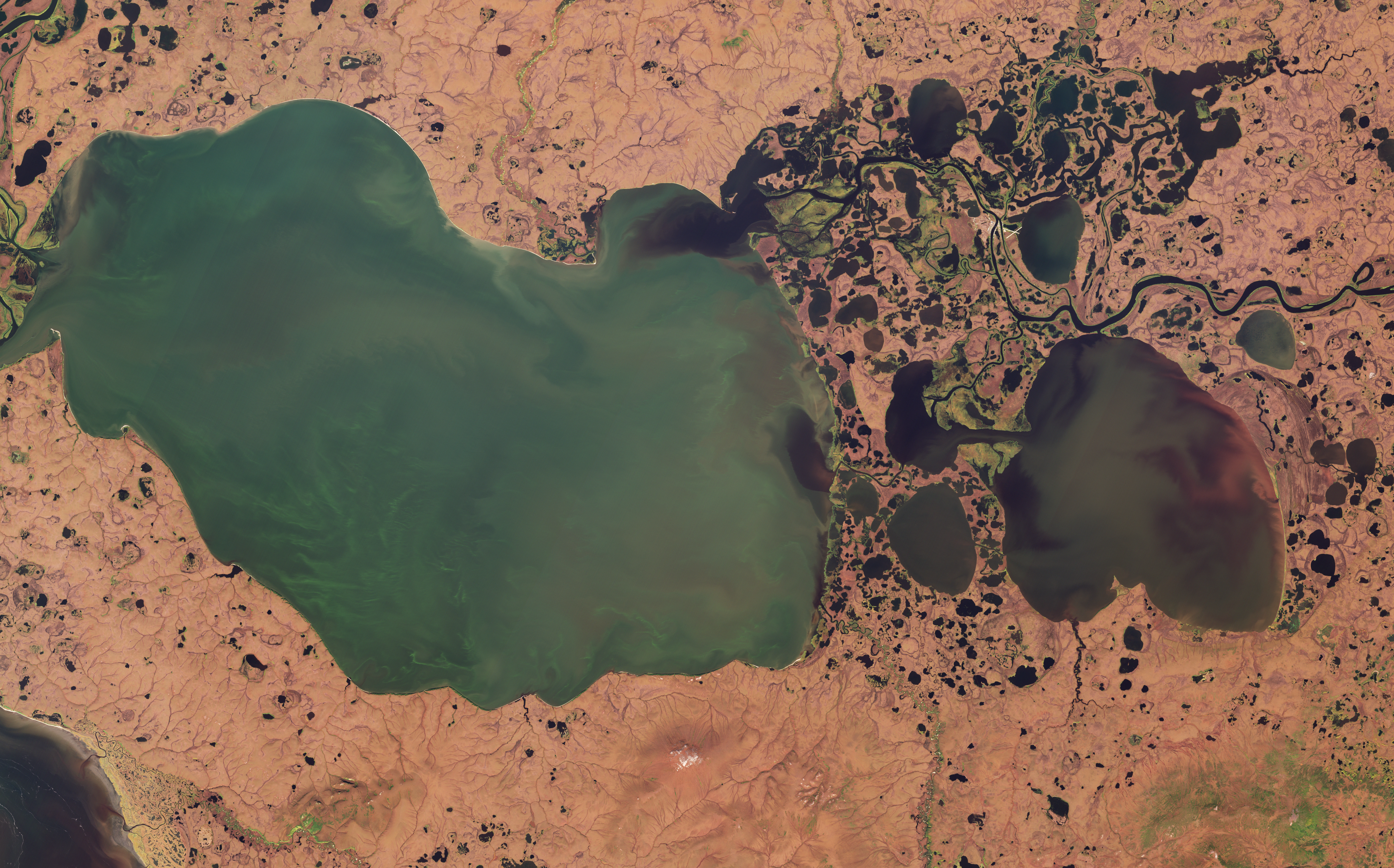
- Satellite image of Selawik Lake by Sentinel-2

- Location within Alaska Location within North America
- Location: Northwest Arctic Borough, Alaska
- Coordinates: 66°29′39″N 160°41′27″W
- Basin countries: United States
- Max. length: 31 miles (50 km)
- Surface area: 404 square miles (1,050 km^{2})
- Surface elevation: 0 metres (0 ft)

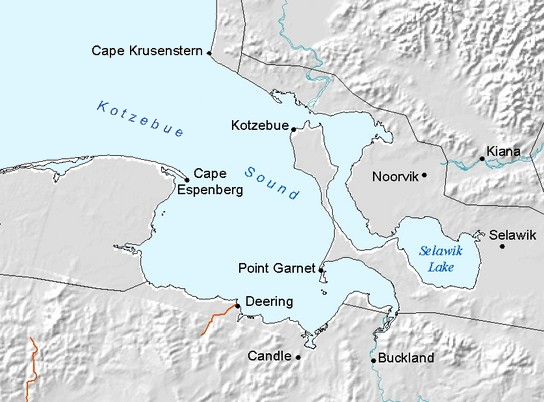
Map showing Selawik Lake and Kotzebue Sound

Selawik Lake (Inupiaq: Imaġruk) is a lake located 7 miles (11 km) southwest of Selawik, Alaska. It is 31 miles (50 km) long. It is adjacent to the Selawik National Wildlife Refuge and the Baldwin Peninsula, feeding into the Hotham Inlet and Kotzebue Sound.

Selawik Lake is the third largest lake in Alaska after Iliamna Lake and Becharof Lake, and seventeenth largest lake in the United States of America.

== History ==
Its Iñupiaq language name was first reported in 1842–44 by Lt. Lavrenty Zagoskin, IRN, who spelled it Chilivik, and probably meant to apply to an Iñupiaq tribe or village. It appears to have been by one of the Sir John Franklin search expeditions about 1850.
