= Kobuk River Stampede =

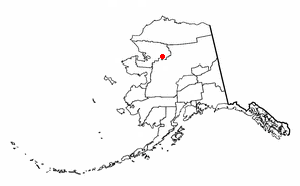
Location of the Kobuk River

The Kobuk River Stampede was a brief gold rush on the Kobuk River in Alaska. From 1897 to 1898, several false accounts of the discovery of gold on the Kobuk led nearly 2,000 gold seekers to the area. Most of these prospectors arrived by ship, during the spring of 1898, from the West Coast of North America. The gold rush was brief, with its peak from 1898 to 1899, for local people spread the word upon arrival that no gold was to be found. Out of these 2,000 people, only 800 remained to search; and despite their efforts, only small amounts of placer and lode gold were discovered on a few of the Kobuk's tributaries. Other than the gold deposits, copper, asbestos and lead were also found.

Because of the disappointingly small amount of gold, most of the prospectors left soon, some bound for other gold strikes at Nome and the Koyukuk River. Even though the area still produces some placer gold, the gold rush did not notably affect the economy and development of the area.

== See also ==
- Gold mining in Alaska
