= Salmon River (Kobuk River tributary) =

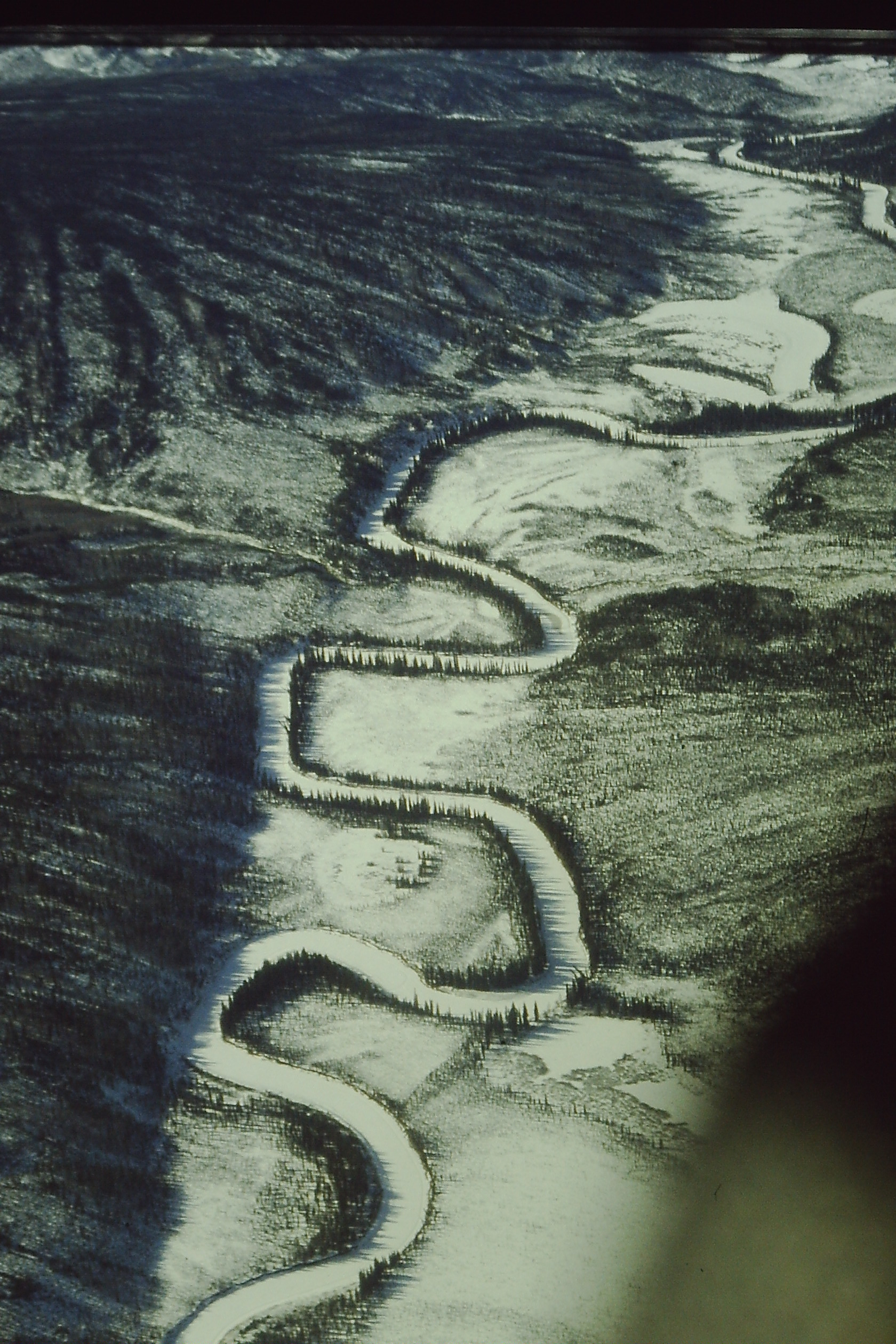
- The Salmon River meanders during the wintertime.

- Location within Alaska

Location
- Country: United States
- State: Alaska

National Wild and Scenic River
- Type: Wild
- Designated: December 2, 1980

The Salmon River arises in the Baird Mountains of the Brooks Range and flows 60 miles (97 km) south to join the Kobuk River 2 miles (3.2 km) southwest of its junction with the Tutksuk River. It is part of the National Wild and Scenic Rivers System and lies entirely within the Kobuk Valley National Park in Alaska.
