= Baldwin Peninsula =

Peninsula in Alaska, United States

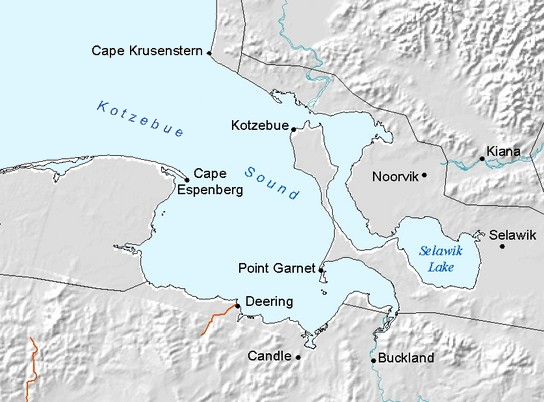
Map showing Kotzebue Sound with the town of Kotzebue at the tip of Baldwin Peninsula

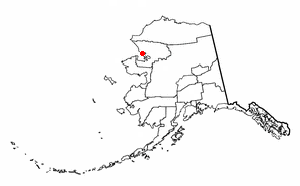
Location of Baldwin Peninsula in Alaska

The Baldwin Peninsula (Iñupiaq: Qikiqtaġruk) is a peninsula located on the Arctic Circle in the northwestern region of the U.S. state of Alaska, at 66°33′06″N 161°55′44″W. It extends 72 km (45 mi) into Kotzebue Sound from the Alaska mainland and defines the south boundary of Hotham Inlet. It is 2–19 km (1.2–11.8 mi) wide and named after Leonard D. Baldwin, a New York City attorney and investor who in conjunction with the Lomen brothers, introduced domesticated reindeer to Alaska, which Inuit in Alaska took part in.

The city of Kotzebue and Ralph Wien Memorial Airport are located at the end of the peninsula. The remainder of Baldwin Peninsula is covered with permafrost and hundreds of tundra lakes.

== Sources ==
- USGS Geographic Names Information System, Baldwin Peninsula
