= Selawik River =

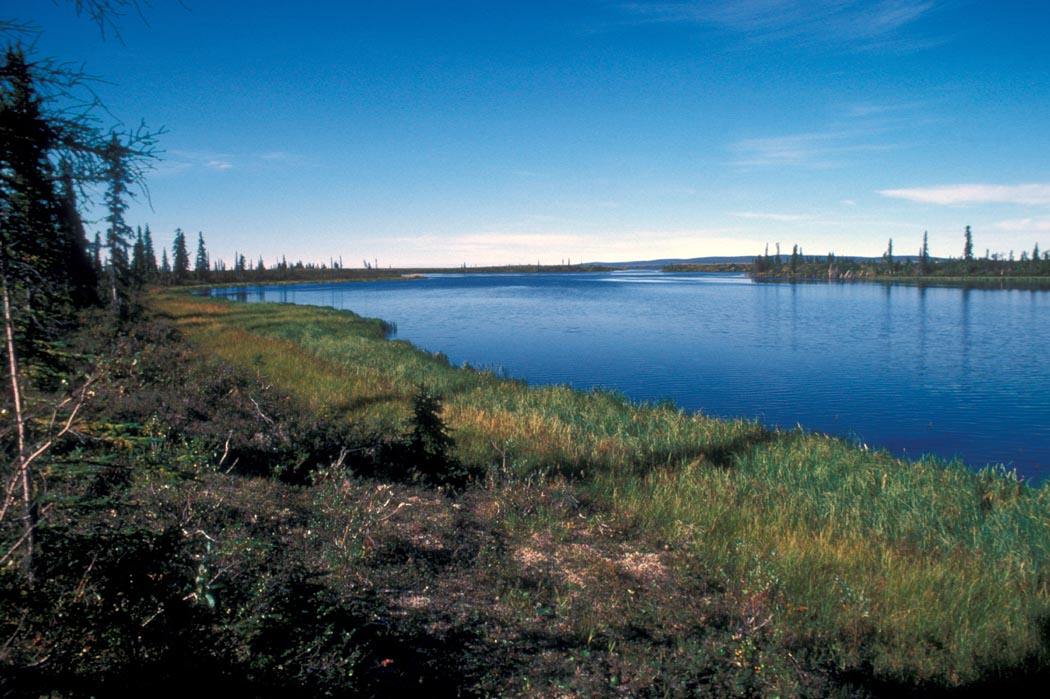
- Flowing through the Selawik National Wildlife Refuge

- Location of the mouth of the Selawik River in Alaska
- Native name: Siiḷivium Kuuŋa (Inupiaq)

Location
- Country: United States
- State: Alaska
- District: Yukon–Koyukuk Census Area, Northwest Arctic Borough

Physical characteristics
- Source: Purcell Mountains
  - location: Yukon–Koyukuk Census Area
  - coordinates: 66°16′52″N 156°50′51″W
  - elevation: 1,825 ft (556 m)
- Mouth: Selawik Lake
  - location: 8 miles (13 km) north of Selawik, Northwest Arctic Borough
  - coordinates: 66°36′06″N 160°19′47″W
  - elevation: 0 ft (0 m)
- Length: 140 mi (230 km)

National Wild and Scenic River
- Type: Wild 168.0 miles (270.4 km)
- Designated: December 2, 1980

The Selawik River (Iñupiaq: Siiḷivium Kuuŋa; Koyukon: Nozaatne) is a stream, 140 miles (230 km) long, in the northwestern part of the U.S. state of Alaska. Originating in the Purcell Mountains near the Zane Hills, it flows generally west through the Selawik National Wildlife Refuge to Selawik Lake, which empties into the Kotzebue Sound in the Chukchi Sea. The river is approximately at the latitude of the Arctic Circle.

The village of Selawik is along the river near its mouth. The river is used for subsistence fishing by residents and for rafting and sport fishing by tourists.

== See also ==
- List of rivers of Alaska
