= Ambler River =

Coordinates: 67°05′16″N 157°50′34″W

Physical characteristics
- Length: 75 mi (121 km)

Ambler River (Inupiaq: Nakmaktuak) is a river in the Northwest Arctic Borough, Alaska, United States.

It rises in the Schwatka Mountains (in the Gates of the Arctic National Park and Preserve), flows towards the southwest, receives the Redstone River and the Miluet Creek from the right, and merges into the Kobuk River.
