= Baird Mountains =

Mountain range in Alaska, United States

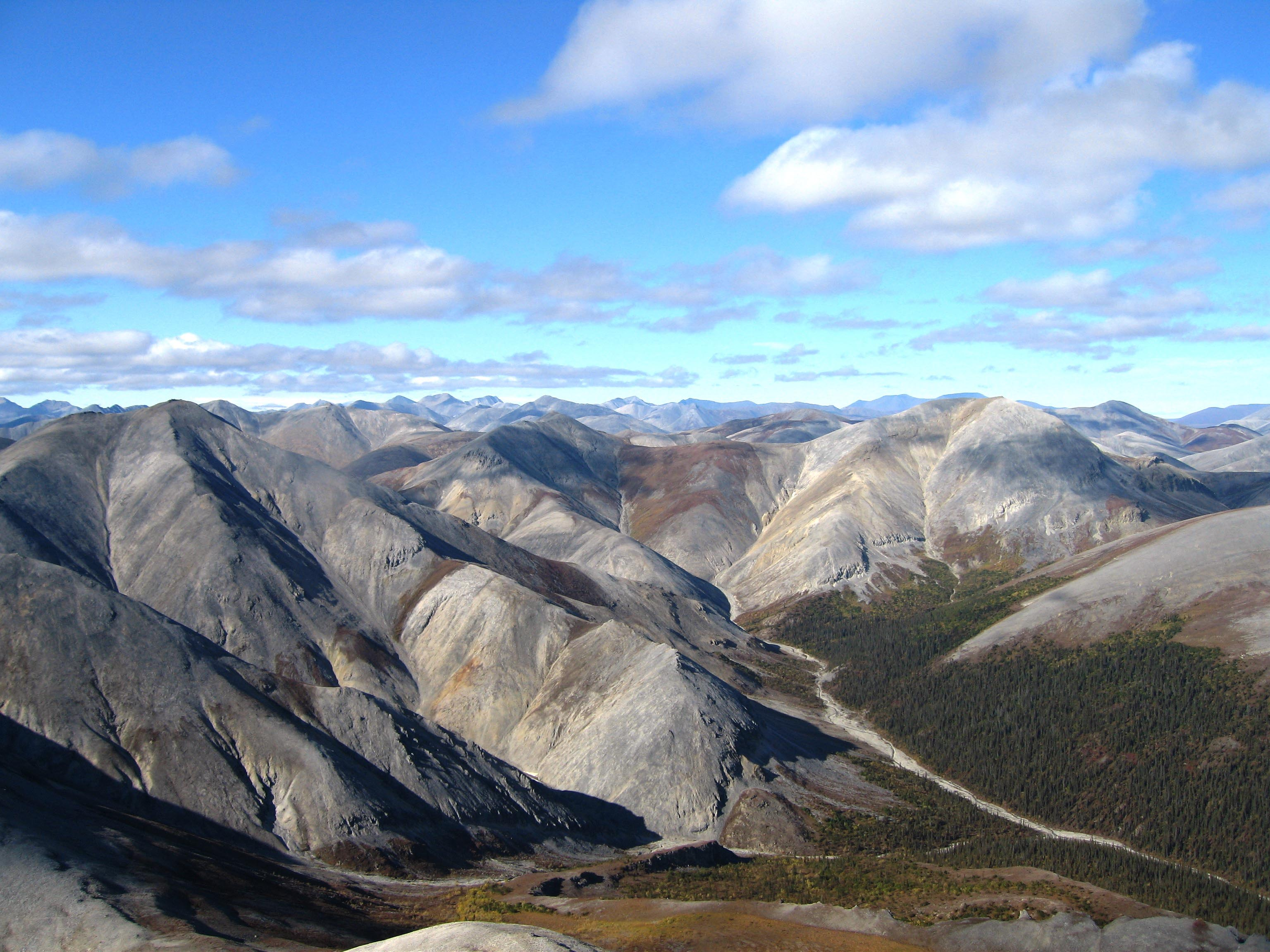
- Aerial view of the Baird Mountains

Highest point
- Peak: Mount Angayukaqsraq
- Elevation: 4,700 ft (1,400 m)+

Dimensions
- Area: 8,736 mi^{2} (22,630 km^{2})

Geography
- Country: United States
- State: Alaska
- Range coordinates: 66.60°N 160.04°W

The Baird Mountains are a mountain range located northeast of the Kotzebue Sound, in between the Kobuk and Noatak Rivers in Alaska. The range was named after Smithsonian Institution Secretary Spencer F. Baird.

== Geographical setting ==
The Baird Mountains are located at 66.60°N 160.04°W in the Western Brooks mountain range in northwestern Alaska, consisting of 5,600 square miles (15,000 square kilometers). The mountains are approximately sixty miles (97 kilometers) northeast of the town of Kotzebue, Alaska. Although the mountains seem much greater in size due to their closeness to the rivers, they are not very large when compared with the other Alaskan mountains that have elevations from 1,000 to 4,500 feet. The Baird Mountains have an elevation that reaches to approximately 3,000 feet (910 m), with its highest peak at Mount Angayukaqsraq, which has an elevation above 4,700 feet (1,400 m).

== Human history ==
The Kuuvanmiit Eskimos, a branch of the Iñupiat Eskimos who have resided among polar regions from Alaska to Greenland, have lived in the five villages along the Kobuk River in the Baird Mountains region for thousands of years. They are hunter-gatherers and are amongst the few people who continue to live by such a lifestyle in North America. The Jade Mountains within the Baird Range have historically been an important source of minerals to the Iñupiaq people. Pre-contact, jade was one of the strongest materials available and was used in the making of a number of necessary items, including tools, weaponry, knives, and beads.

== Ecology and climate ==
The climate of the Baird Mountains is mostly like that of the rest of Alaska. Since the Pacific Ocean is near the Baird Mountains, the ocean greatly influences and enhances the temperature extremities. Winter lasts approximately five months, from November to March, during which the temperature is near or below 0 °F. The temperature can drop as low as −60 °F to −70 °F, and it is not uncommon for cold spells of −40 °F to −50 °F to last from one to three weeks. The level of snowfall can reach approximately 100 inches in the mountains to about 45 inches in lower elevations. Gale winds and snow from storms that blow in from the coast interrupt this below-freezing period, causing temperatures to rise from 0 °F to 20 °F or higher. The other extremity consists of summer, which only lasts for three months, from June to August. Precipitation is heaviest during the summer, bringing warmer temperatures along with common convective showers, in which the intensity of the rain quickly changes. Temperatures range from as low as c. 35 °F to as high as 90 °F, averaging from about 50 °F to 60 °F. Spring and autumn come and go rather quickly, lingering for only six to eight weeks.

Daylight periods change as the seasons change. From May to August, darkness does not linger for long. Instead of rising or setting, the sun circles just above the horizon, turning to darkness only for a few hours when the sun circles behind the mountains. During the quick seasons of spring and autumn, the length of daylight changes by six to eight minutes each day.

== Flora ==
The vegetation in the Baird Mountains is surprisingly varied for an area just above the Arctic Circle, and over 360 plant species are endemic. A network of different patterns of forests, tundra and plants lining the coasts vary depending on their elevation, climate, soil and fire history.
