= Selawik, Alaska =

City in Alaska, United States

Selawik: Inupiaq: Siiḷivik / Akuliġaq
- City
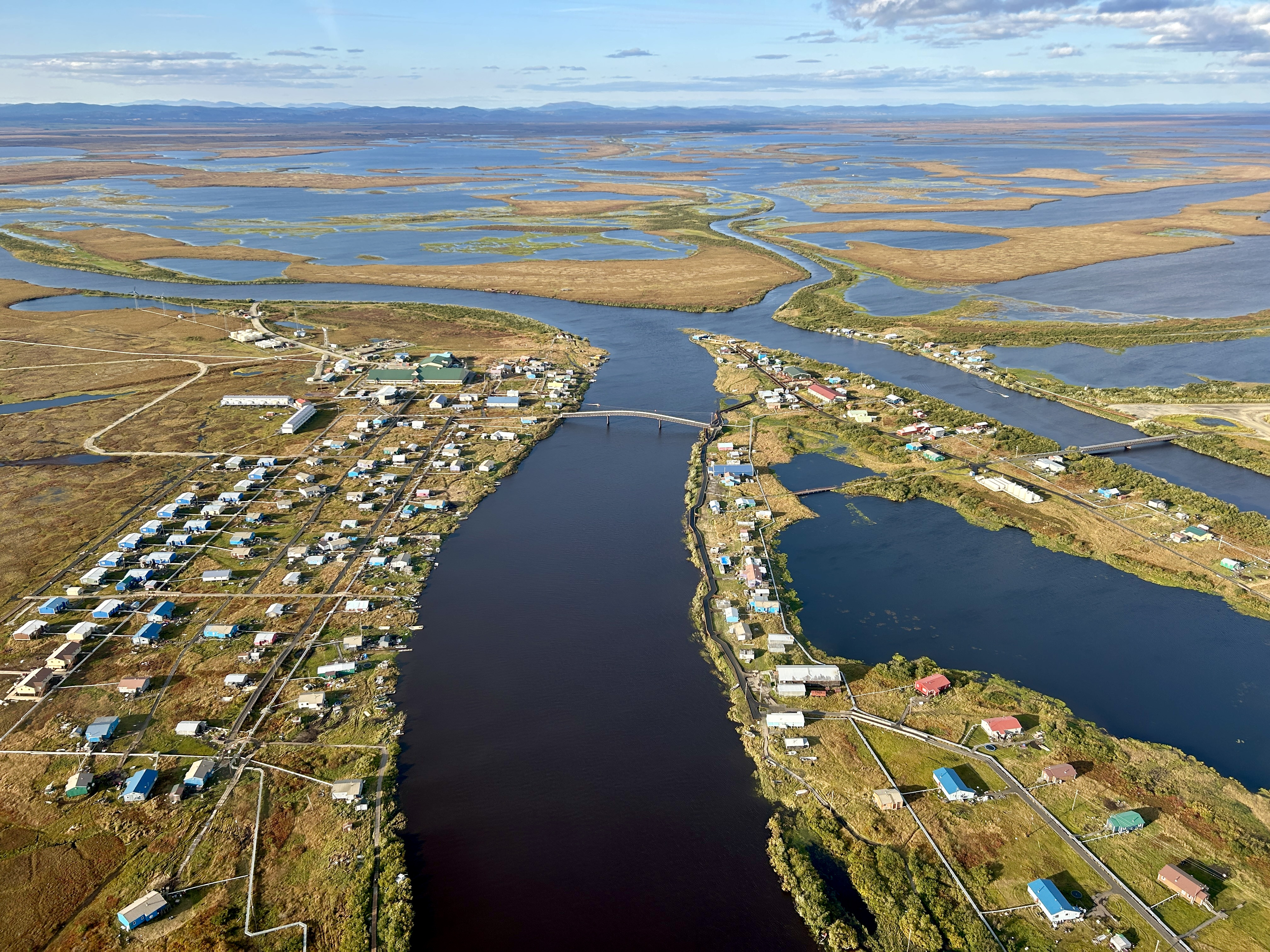
- An aerial view of Selawik in 2024

- Location in Northwest Arctic Borough and the state of Alaska.
- Coordinates: 66°35′49″N 160°0′49″W
- Country: United States
- State: Alaska
- Borough: Northwest Arctic
- Incorporated: 1977

Government
  - Mayor: Patrick Foster, Jr.
  - State senator: Donny Olson (D)
  - State rep.: Robyn Burke (D)

Area
  - Total: 2.94 sq mi (7.62 km^{2})
  - Land: 2.33 sq mi (6.04 km^{2})
  - Water: 0.61 sq mi (1.59 km^{2})
- Elevation: 0 ft (0 m)

Population (2020)
  - Total: 809
  - Density: 347.0/sq mi (133.99/km^{2})
- Time zone: UTC-9 (Alaska (AKST))
  - Summer (DST): UTC-8 (AKDT)
- ZIP code: 99770
- Area code: 907
- FIPS code: 02-68230
- GNIS feature ID: 1413930

Selawik (/ˈsɛləwɪk/) (Iñupiaq: Siiḷ(i)vik or Akuliġaq) is a city in Northwest Arctic Borough, Alaska, United States. As of the 2020 census, Selawik had a population of 809.

Selawik comes from siiḷivik, which means "place of sheefish" in Inupiaq.

== Geography ==
Selawik is located at 66°35′49″N 160°0′49″W (66.597043, -160.013674).

Selawik is located at the mouth of the Selawik River where it empties into Selawik Lake, about 112 km (70 mi) southeast of Kotzebue.

Selawik is near the Selawik National Wildlife Refuge, a breeding and resting area for migratory waterfowl.

According to the United States Census Bureau, the city has a total area of 3.4 square miles (8.8 km^{2}), of which, 2.5 square miles (6.5 km^{2}) of it is land and 0.9 square miles (2.3 km^{2}) of it (26.24%) is water.

It has no road or rail access but is served by Selawik Airport.

== Demographics ==
Historical population
Census	Pop.	Note	%±
1880	100		—
1920	274		—
1930	227		−17.2%
1940	239		5.3%
1950	273		14.2%
1960	348		27.5%
1970	429		23.3%
1980	535		24.7%
1990	596		11.4%
2000	772		29.5%
2010	829		7.4%
2020	809		−2.4%
U.S. Decennial Census

Selawik first appeared on the 1880 U.S. Census as the unincorporated Inuit village of "Selawigamute." All 100 residents were Inuit. It did not appear again on the census until 1920, that time as Selawik. It has appeared on every successive census to date. It formally incorporated in 1963.

=== 2020 census ===
As of the 2020 census, Selawik had a population of 809. The median age was 24.0 years. 40.7% of residents were under the age of 18 and 7.2% of residents were 65 years of age or older. For every 100 females there were 115.2 males, and for every 100 females age 18 and over there were 116.2 males age 18 and over.

0.0% of residents lived in urban areas, while 100.0% lived in rural areas.

There were 200 households in Selawik, of which 56.0% had children under the age of 18 living in them. Of all households, 29.5% were married-couple households, 23.0% were households with a male householder and no spouse or partner present, and 25.5% were households with a female householder and no spouse or partner present. About 22.5% of all households were made up of individuals and 3.0% had someone living alone who was 65 years of age or older.

There were 214 housing units, of which 6.5% were vacant. The homeowner vacancy rate was 0.0% and the rental vacancy rate was 2.5%.

Racial composition as of the 2020 census
Race	Number	Percent
White	16	2.0%
Black or African American	0	0.0%
American Indian and Alaska Native	786	97.2%
Asian	0	0.0%
Native Hawaiian and Other Pacific Islander	0	0.0%
Some other race	0	0.0%
Two or more races	7	0.9%
Hispanic or Latino (of any race)	0	0.0%

=== 2000 census ===
As of the census of 2000, there were 772 people, 172 households, and 147 families residing in the city. The population density was 306.1 inhabitants per square mile (118.2/km^{2}). There were 188 housing units at an average density of 74.5 units per square mile (28.8 units/km^{2}). The racial makeup of the city was 3.24% White, 0.13% Black or African American, 94.82% Native American, 0.78% Asian, 0.13% Pacific Islander, and 0.91% from two or more races. 0.13% of the population were Hispanic or Latino of any race.

There were 172 households, out of which 68.6% had children under the age of 18 living with them, 41.9% were married couples living together, 29.1% had a female householder with no husband present, and 14.5% were non-families. 12.8% of all households were made up of individuals, and 1.2% had someone living alone who was 65 years of age or older. The average household size was 4.49 and the average family size was 4.78.

In the city, the age distribution of the population shows 48.1% under the age of 18, 12.7% from 18 to 24, 23.1% from 25 to 44, 10.6% from 45 to 64, and 5.6% who were 65 years of age or older. The median age was 19 years. For every 100 females, there were 108.1 males. For every 100 females age 18 and over, there were 116.8 males.

The median income for a household in the city was $25,625, and the median income for a family was $27,639. Males had a median income of $50,278 versus $40,417 for females. The per capita income for the city was $8,170. About 34.6% of families and 34.4% of the population were below the poverty line, including 36.2% of those under age 18 and 22.7% of those age 65 or over.

== History ==
A Lt. Lavrenty Zagoskin of the Imperial Russian Navy first reported the village in the 1840s as "Chilivik." In his census study in 1880, Ivan Petrof counted 100 "Selawigamute" people.

Around 1908, the village site had a small wooden schoolhouse and church. The village now has expanded across the Selawik River onto three banks, linked by bridges.

== Education ==
The Davis-Ramoth Memorial School, operated by the Northwest Arctic Borough School District, serves the community. As of 2017 it had about 270 students, with Alaska Natives making up the majority.
