= Selawik National Wildlife Refuge =

Nature reserve in Alaska

- IUCN category IV (habitat/species management area)
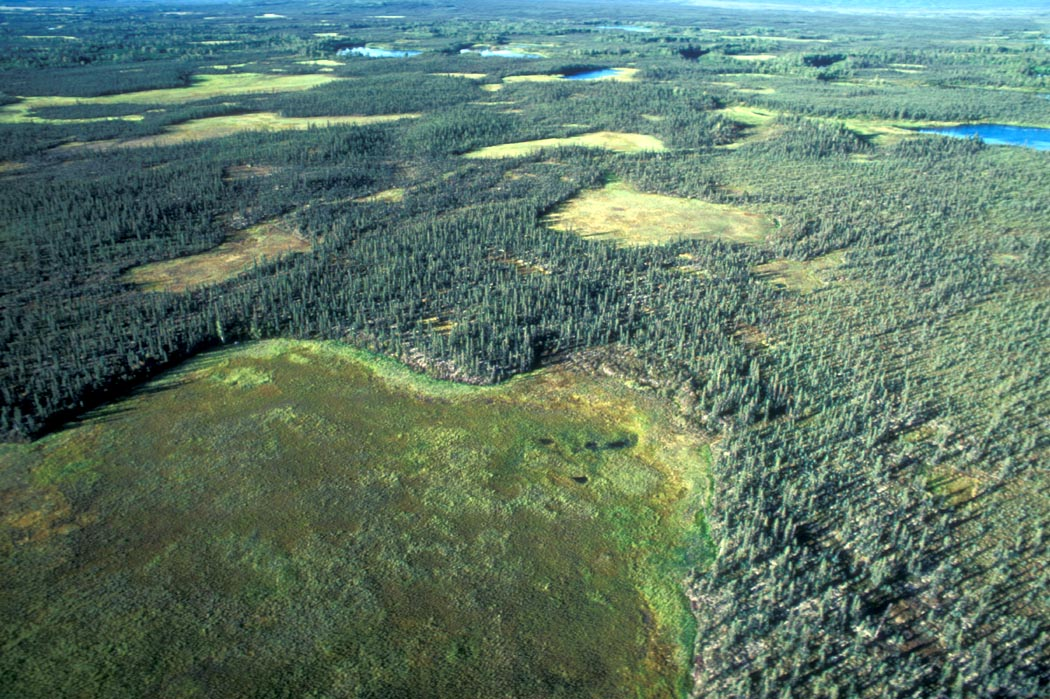
- Selawik Refuge Wetlands

- Location within Alaska
- Location: Alaska, United States
- Nearest city: Selawik, Alaska
- Coordinates: 66°35′N 159°10′W
- Area: 3,400 sq mi (8,800 km^{2})
- Established: 1980
- Governing body: U.S. Fish and Wildlife Service
- Website: Selawik NWR

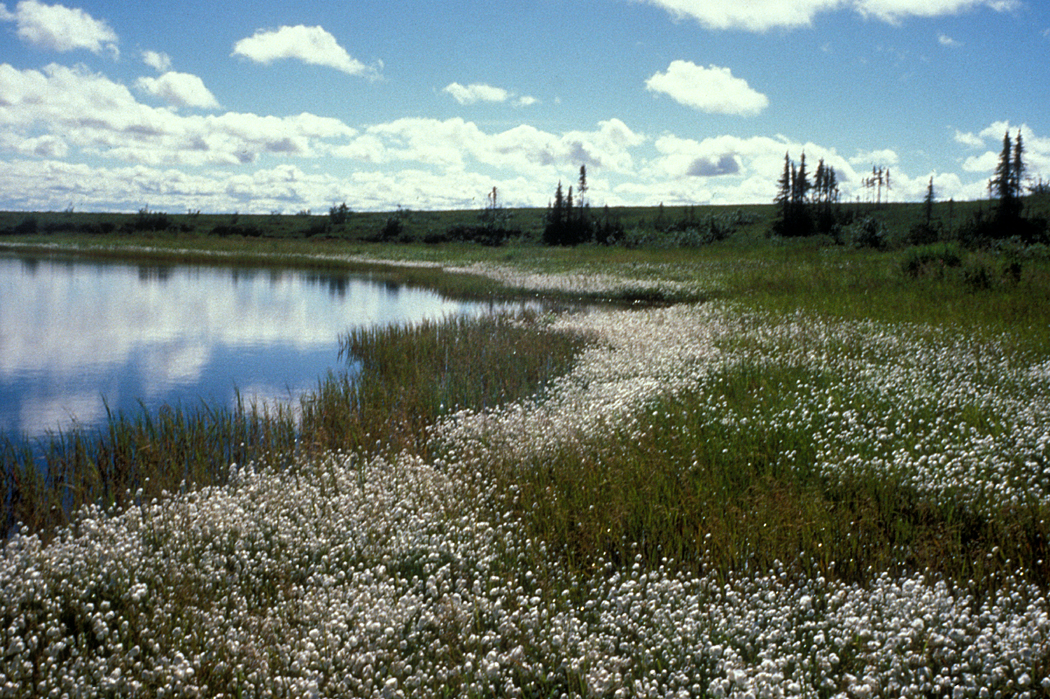
Cottongrass on the refuge wetlands

Selawik National Wildlife Refuge in northwest Alaska in the Waring Mountains was officially established in 1980 with the passage of the Alaska National Interest Lands Conservation Act (ANILCA).

This national wildlife refuge is home to mammalian and bird species such as muskox, wolverine, grizzly bear, moose, black bear, two species of fox, snow goose, beaver, tundra swan, caribou, marten, Canada goose, river otter, Canadian lynx, raven, porcupine, mink, and wolf packs. The 3,400 square mile (8,700 km^{2}) refuge is situated on the Arctic Circle to the east of Kotzebue Sound. It is bounded on the north by the Waring Mountains and Kobuk Valley National Park; and to the south by the Selawik Hills and the Purcell Mountains. Refuge lands extend eastward toward the headwaters of the Selawik River and the Continental Divide. The refuge is administered from offices in Kotzebue.

Some of the land includes alpine tundra, arctic tundra, taiga, lake and wetland complexes, large river deltas, open grass and sedge meadows, and previously glaciated mountains and river valleys. Rolling, vegetated sand dunes were formed by the last retreat of the glaciers. These dunes are the remnant of a much larger system that once included the Great Kobuk Sand Dunes to the north.

This area is a transition zone where the northernmost boreal forests give way to open Arctic tundra. The Selawik and Kobuk River deltas, located on the eastern shores of Selawik Lake and Hotham Inlet (Kobuk Lake), provide habitat for migratory bird species. The complex array of freshwater and brackish lakes, riparian areas, and wet meadows, provide habitat and large, undisturbed, tracts for a variety of wildlife species. The approximately 21,000 lakes that occur on refuge lowlands create a large Arctic tundra lake complex.

== Wilderness ==
Also established in 1980 as part of National Wilderness Preservation System, 240,000 acres in the northern part of the refuge are set aside as the federally designated Selawik Wilderness. With no trails or facilities, access to this wilderness area is quite difficult.
