= Ambler, Alaska =

City in the United States

Ambler Ivisaappaat
- City
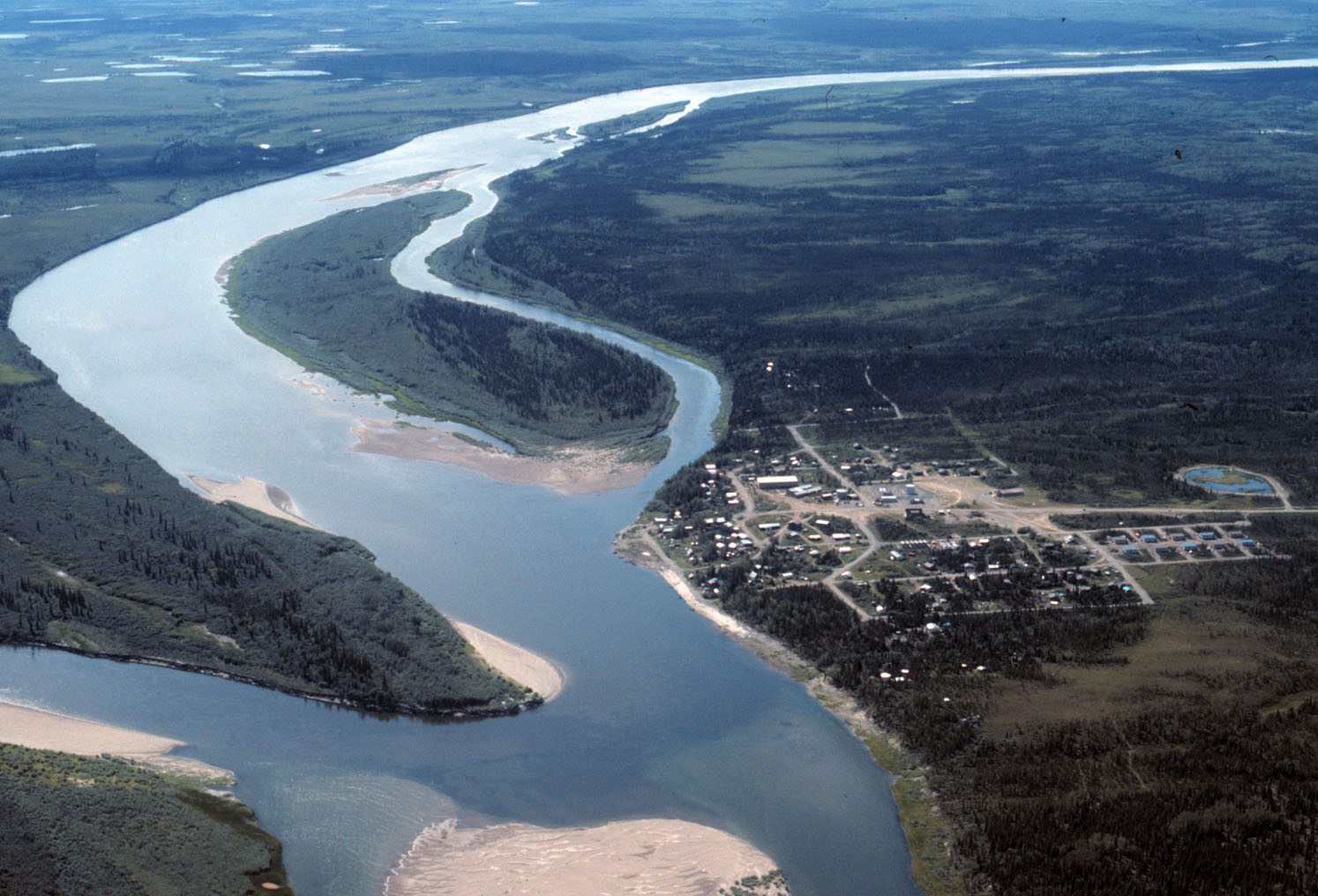
- Aerial summer view of Ambler

- Location in Northwest Arctic Borough and the state of Alaska.
- Coordinates: 67°5′6″N 157°51′37″W
- Country: United States
- State: Alaska
- Borough: Northwest Arctic
- Incorporated: March 26, 1971

Government
  - Mayor: Morgan Johnson
  - State senator: Donny Olson (D)
  - State rep.: Robyn Burke (D)

Area
  - Total: 11.85 sq mi (30.68 km^{2})
  - Land: 10.28 sq mi (26.62 km^{2})
  - Water: 1.57 sq mi (4.06 km^{2})
- Elevation: 79 ft (24 m)

Population (2020)
  - Total: 274
  - Density: 26.7/sq mi (10.29/km^{2})
- Time zone: UTC-9 (Alaska (AKST))
  - Summer (DST): UTC-8 (AKDT)
- ZIP code: 99786
- Area code: 907
- FIPS code: 02-01970
- GNIS feature ID: 1412509

Ambler (Inupiaq: Ivisaappaat, IPA: [ivisaːpːaːt]) is a city in Northwest Arctic Borough, Alaska, United States. As of the 2020 census, Ambler had a population of 274. The city is located in the large Iñupiaq language speaking region of Alaska, and the local dialect is known as the Ambler dialect (related to the Shugnak dialect). As of 1999, over 91% of the community speaks and understands the language (Kraus, 1999), with many young children actively learning the language in school. It has important relationships with the "hub" city of Kotzebue, Alaska and has important relationships with Maniilaq Health Association.

== Geography ==
Ambler is located at 67°05′06″N 157°51′37″W, on the north bank of the Kobuk River, near the confluence of the Ambler and the Kobuk Rivers. It lies 45 miles north of the Arctic Circle. It is 138 miles northeast of Kotzebue, 30 miles northwest of Kobuk and 30 miles downriver from Shungnak. Ambler is located in the Kotzebue Recording District.

According to the United States Census Bureau, the city has a total area of 10.8 square miles (28 km^{2}). 9.5 square miles (25 km^{2}) of it is land and 1.3 square miles (3.4 km^{2}) of it (11.91%) is water.

== Climate ==
Ambler is located in the continental climate zone. Temperatures have ranged from 93 °F to −74 °F. The Kobuk River is navigable from early June to mid-October. Ambler has a subarctic climate with long, extremely cold winters and short, warm summers. Temperatures in the winter often drop below −40 °C/°F, just like most of interior Alaska, but it frequently gets mild spells where the temperatures stay above 10 °F (−12 °C) for several days in a row because of the relative closeness to the Pacific Ocean. It occasionally gets above freezing in winter, even in January, although it is not very common. Places further East like Fairbanks and Fort Yukon, for comparison, are usually lightly affected by the mild Pacific air. Ambler is also wetter because of this. Summers are quite variable too, as the weather alternates between warm days and cooler days. The highest temperature of any given year is about 80 °F (26 °C) and occasionally above 86 °F (30 °C), occurring as recently as June 18 and 19, 2013 with a maximum temperature of 90 °F (32 °C) recorded on both days. Below is a table containing data for the period 1981-1992:

Climate data for Ambler West, Alaska
Month	Jan	Feb	Mar	Apr	May	Jun	Jul	Aug	Sep	Oct	Nov	Dec	Year
Record high °F (°C)	37 (3)	38 (3)	40 (4)	53 (12)	85 (29)	93 (34)	92 (33)	85 (29)	75 (24)	46 (8)	39 (4)	35 (2)	93 (34)
Mean daily maximum °F (°C)	−0.7 (−18.2)	0.8 (−17.3)	14.1 (−9.9)	25.3 (−3.7)	50.7 (10.4)	69.4 (20.8)	71.1 (21.7)	62.0 (16.7)	49.2 (9.6)	26.8 (−2.9)	7.4 (−13.7)	6.6 (−14.1)	31.9 (−0.1)
Daily mean °F (°C)	−9.3 (−22.9)	−9.4 (−23.0)	2.1 (−16.6)	13.5 (−10.3)	40.2 (4.6)	56.3 (13.5)	59.3 (15.2)	52.1 (11.2)	40.7 (4.8)	19.7 (−6.8)	0.1 (−17.7)	−1.7 (−18.7)	22.0 (−5.6)
Mean daily minimum °F (°C)	−17.9 (−27.7)	−19.6 (−28.7)	−10 (−23)	1.8 (−16.8)	29.7 (−1.3)	43.3 (6.3)	47.6 (8.7)	42.2 (5.7)	32.1 (0.1)	12.5 (−10.8)	−7.3 (−21.8)	−9.9 (−23.3)	12.0 (−11.0)
Record low °F (°C)	−74 (−59)	−65 (−54)	−54 (−48)	−38 (−39)	−12 (−24)	25 (−4)	32 (0)	25 (−4)	6 (−14)	−23 (−31)	−49 (−45)	−58 (−50)	−74 (−59)
Average precipitation inches (mm)	1.15 (29)	1.13 (29)	0.92 (23)	1.59 (40)	1.48 (38)	1.33 (34)	2.66 (68)	4.50 (114)	4.35 (110)	1.72 (44)	0.55 (14)	1.67 (42)	23.05 (585)
Average snowfall inches (cm)	19.7 (50)	16.7 (42)	17.6 (45)	17.2 (44)	4.1 (10)	0 (0)	0 (0)	0 (0)	3.7 (9.4)	17.9 (45)	9.6 (24)	27.5 (70)	134 (339.4)

== History ==
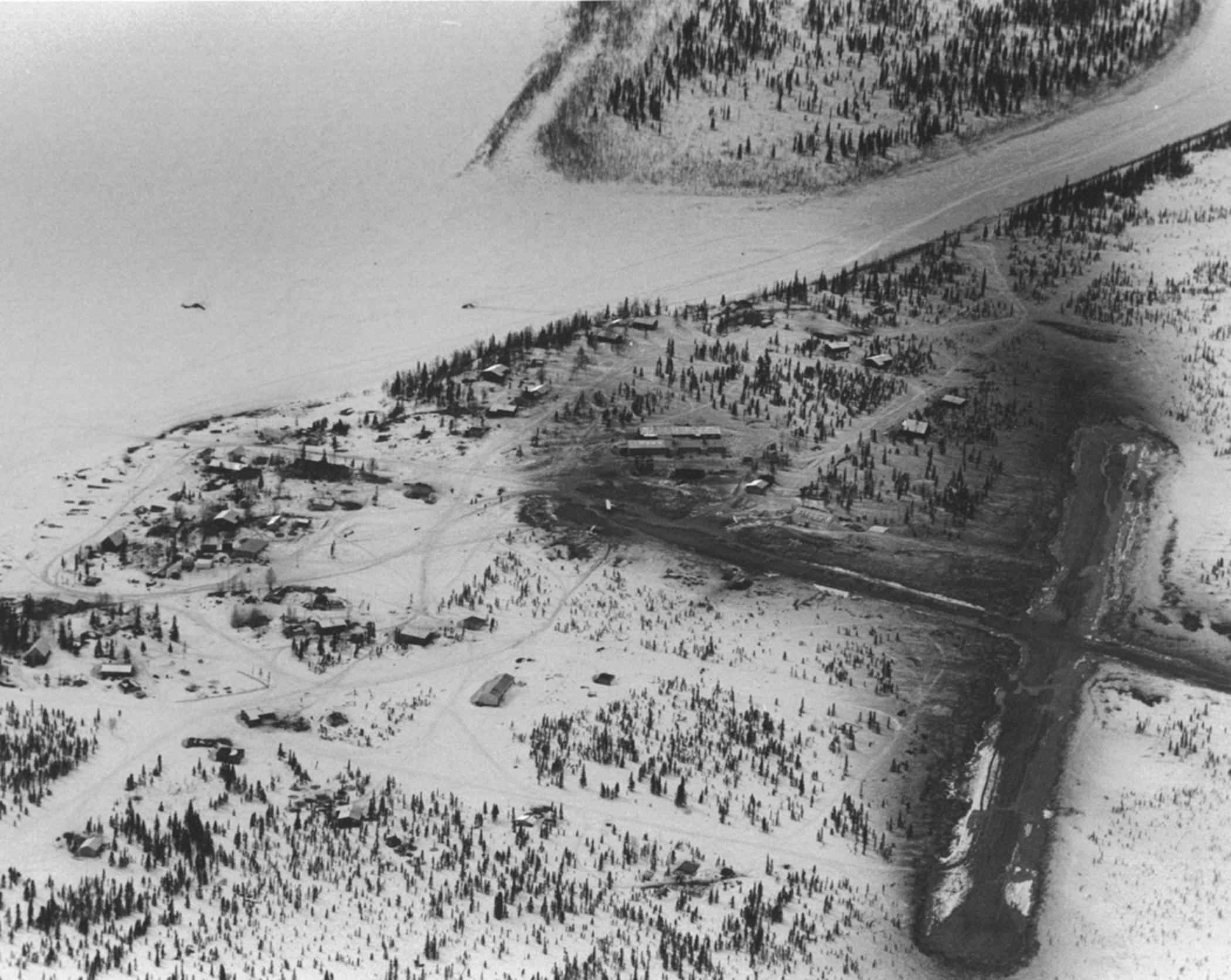
Historical aerial view of Ambler in winter

The community was named for a tributary of the Kobuk River, which was named for Dr. James M. Ambler, who died of starvation after his ship was trapped in the Arctic ice in 1881. Ambler was permanently settled in 1958 when people from Shungnak and Kobuk moved downstream because of the variety of fish, wild game and spruce trees in the area. An archaeological site is located nearby at Onion Portage. A post office was established in 1963 First Post Master was Sarah Tickett. The city was incorporated in 1971. The story of the prophet Maniilaq states that he predicted in the future a great whale would swim upriver and arrive at Ambler. Founding fathers were Harry Tickett, Truman Cleveland, Nelson Greist Sr, Mark Cleveland, Tommy Lee, Charlie Douglas and Tommy Douglas. Current 2023 Ambler IRA President Miles Cleveland Sr.

== Transportation ==
Ambler's major means of transportation are by plane, small boat and snowmachine. There are no roads linking the city to other parts of the state. Ambler Airport, a State-owned 3,000' long by 60' wide lighted gravel airstrip, with a 2,400' long by 60' wide gravel crosswind airstrip, is located one and a half miles from the city. Bering Air, Hageland Aviation, and Ambler Air offer passenger flight service. In addition, daily scheduled services are provided out of Kotzebue, and air taxis provide charter flights. The airstrip has recently^{(written 2008)} undergone major improvements. Boats are used for inter-village travel and subsistence activities. ATVs and snowmachines are commonly used in winter. In connection with plans to start mining, there are plans to build a 211 miles (340 km) road from the Dalton Highway to the Ambler region.

== Economy ==
Cash employment is limited to the school, City, clinic, and local stores, and some mining occurs. Five residents hold commercial fishing permits. Subsistence is a major part of the local economy. Chum salmon and caribou are the most important food sources. Freshwater fish, moose, bear, and berries are also harvested. Birch baskets, fur pelts, and jade, quartz, bone and ivory carvings are sold in gift shops throughout the state. The community is interested in developing a lapidary facility for local artisans. There are plans to start mining in the region. There are large deposits.

== Demographics ==
Historical population
Census	Pop.	Note	%±
1960	70		—
1970	169		141.4%
1980	192		13.6%
1990	311		62.0%
2000	309		−0.6%
2010	258		−16.5%
2020	274		6.2%
U.S. Decennial Census

Ambler first appeared on the 1960 U.S. Census as an unincorporated village. It formally incorporated in 1971.

=== 2020 census ===
As of the 2020 census, Ambler had a population of 274. The median age was 27.8 years. 38.0% of residents were under the age of 18 and 12.4% of residents were 65 years of age or older. For every 100 females there were 103.0 males, and for every 100 females age 18 and over there were 93.2 males age 18 and over.

0.0% of residents lived in urban areas, while 100.0% lived in rural areas.

There were 79 households in Ambler, of which 63.3% had children under the age of 18 living in them. Of all households, 31.6% were married-couple households, 22.8% were households with a male householder and no spouse or partner present, and 25.3% were households with a female householder and no spouse or partner present. About 16.4% of all households were made up of individuals and 7.6% had someone living alone who was 65 years of age or older.

There were 100 housing units, of which 21.0% were vacant. The homeowner vacancy rate was 0.0% and the rental vacancy rate was 29.6%.

Racial composition as of the 2020 census
Race	Number	Percent
White	17	6.2%
Black or African American	3	1.1%
American Indian and Alaska Native	236	86.1%
Asian	0	0.0%
Native Hawaiian and Other Pacific Islander	0	0.0%
Some other race	0	0.0%
Two or more races	18	6.6%
Hispanic or Latino (of any race)	2	0.7%

=== 2000 census ===
As of the 2000 census, there were 309 people, 79 households, and 63 families residing in the city. The population density was 32.6 inhabitants per square mile (12.6/km^{2}). There were 98 housing units at an average density of 10.4 per square mile (4.0/km^{2}). The racial makeup of the city was 12.94% White, 0.32% Black or African American, 84.79% Native American, and 1.94% from two or more races.

There were 79 households, out of which 54.4% had children under the age of 18 living with them, 45.6% were married couples living together, 25.3% had a female householder with no husband present, and 19.0% were non-families. 16.5% of all households were made up of individuals, and 3.8% had someone living alone who was 65 years of age or older. The average household size was 3.91 and the average family size was 4.33.

In the city, the age distribution of the population shows 41.7% under the age of 18, 12.3% from 18 to 24, 22.7% from 25 to 44, 16.2% from 45 to 64, and 7.1% who were 65 years of age or older. The median age was 22 years. For every 100 females, there were 102.0 males. For every 100 females age 18 and over, there were 95.7 males.

The median income for a household in the city was $43,500, and the median income for a family was $43,571. Males had a median income of $30,625 versus $36,875 for females. The per capita income for the city was $13,712. About 19.0% of families and 14.3% of the population were below the poverty line, including 15.6% of those under the age of 18 and 22.2% of those 65 or over.

== Education ==
The Ambler School, operated by the Northwest Arctic Borough School District, serves the community. As of 2017 it had seven teachers and 69 students, with Alaska Natives making up 94% of the student body.
