= Kotzebue Sound =

Arm of the Chukchi Sea in western Alaska

Coordinates: 66°32′46″N 162°44′58″W

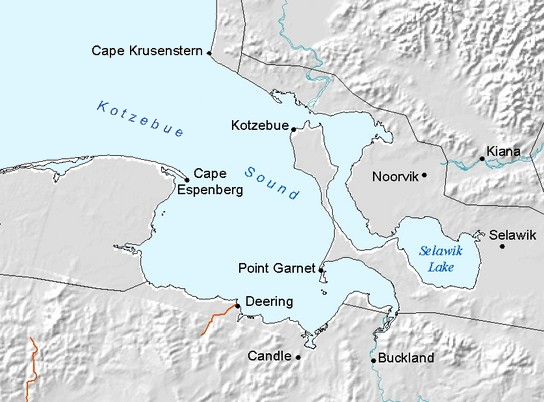
Map of Kotzebue Sound

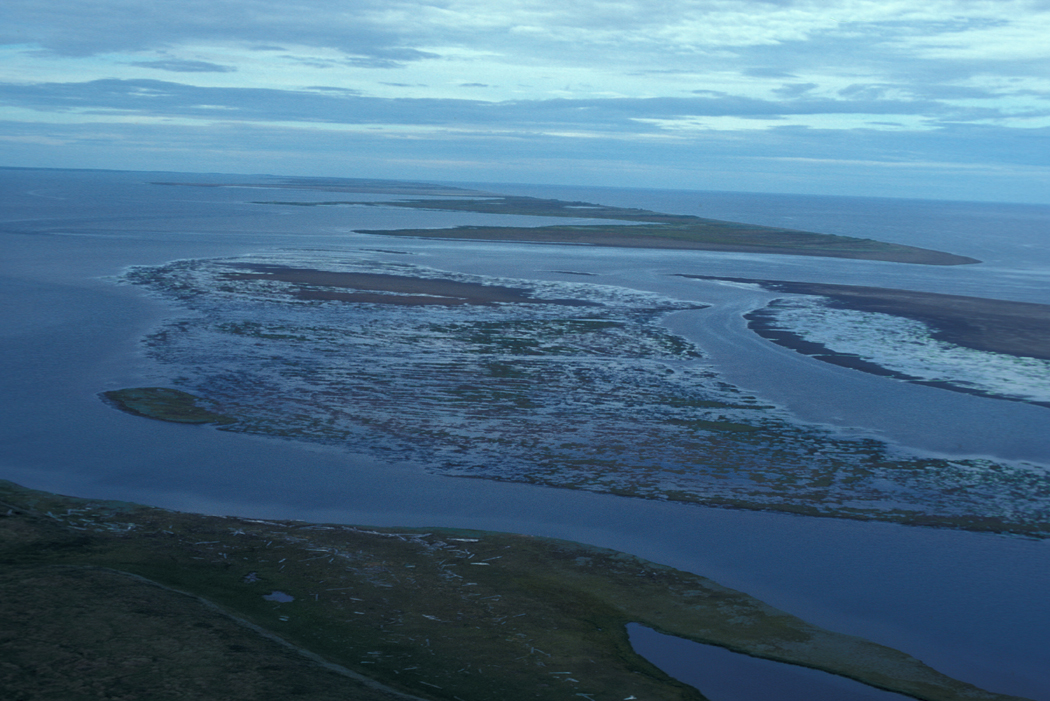
Barrier islands and lagoons at Cape Espenberg

Kotzebue Sound is an arm of the Chukchi Sea in the western region of the U.S. state of Alaska. It is on the north side of the Seward Peninsula and bounded on the east by the Baldwin Peninsula. It is 100 miles (160 km) long and 70 miles (110 km) wide.

Kotzebue Sound is located in the transitional climate zone, which is characterized by long, cold winters and cool summers. The average low temperature during January is −12 °F (−24 °C); the average high during July is 58 °F (14 °C). Temperature extremes have been measured from −52 °F (−47 °C) to 85 °F (29 °C). Snowfall averages 40 inches (1,016 mm), with total precipitation of 9 inches (229 mm) per year. Kotzebue Sound is ice-free from early July until early October.

The towns of Kotzebue, Kiwalik and Deering are on the shores of Kotzebue Sound. Kotzebue Sound was explored and named in 1816 by Baltic German Lieutenant Otto von Kotzebue while searching for the Northeast Passage in the service of Russia.

== Fauna ==
A wide variety of birdlife is apparent at Kotzebue Sound including the tufted puffin, black-throated diver and red-throated loon.

The sound is a location for the presence of the polar bear, Ursus maritimus; in fact, the world's record largest polar bear at 2,210 pounds (1,002 kg) was observed at Kotzebue Sound in 1960.
