= Craters of the Moon National Monument and Preserve =

National monument in Idaho, United States

- IUCN category V (protected landscape/seascape)
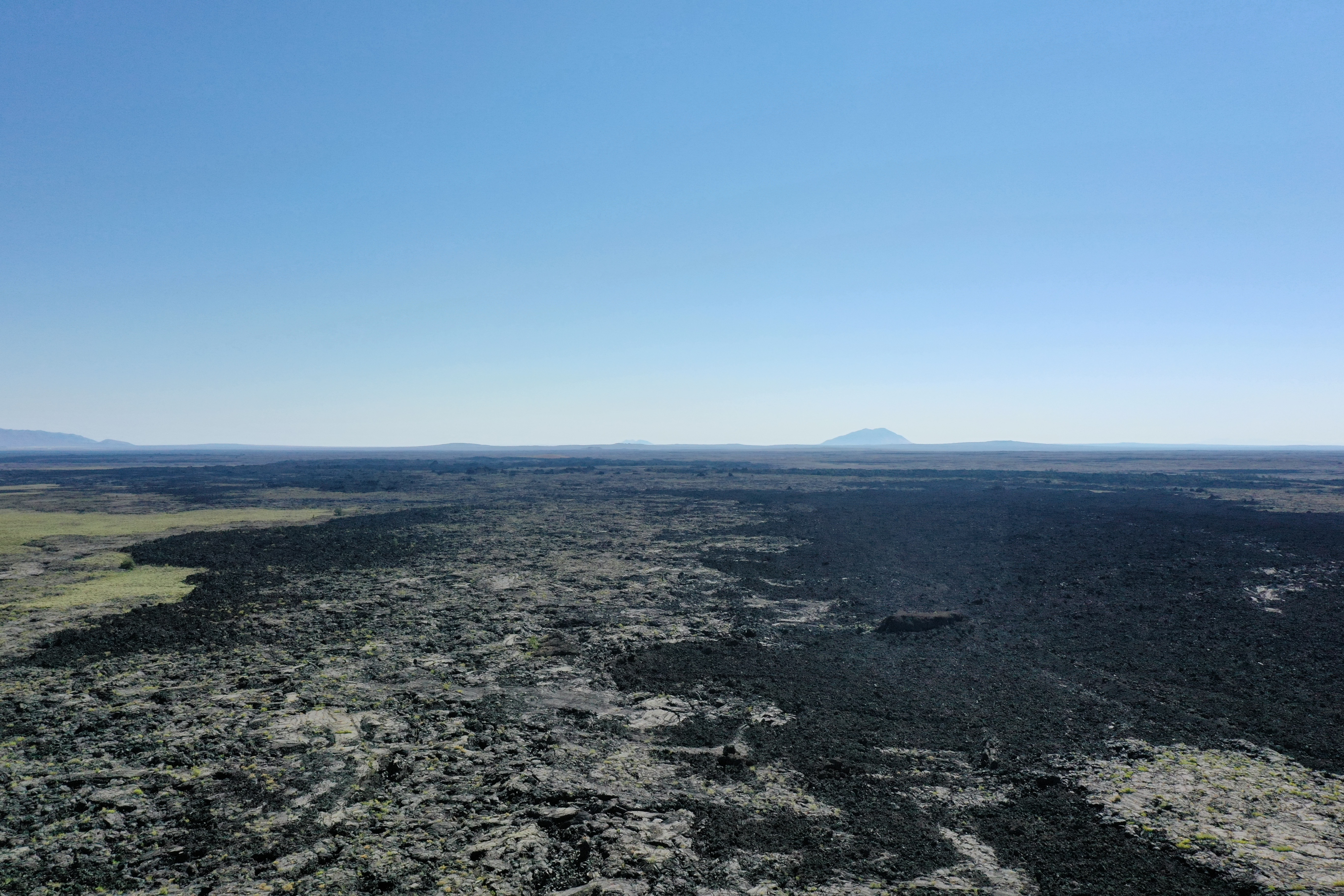

- Location within Idaho Location within the United States
- Interactive map of Craters of the Moon National Monument and Preserve
- Location: South Central Idaho, United States
- Nearest city: Arco (east); Carey (west)
- Coordinates: 43°27′42″N 113°33′46″W
- Area: 753,000 acres (3,050 km^{2})
- Established: Monument: May 2, 1924, Preserve: August 21, 2002
- Visitors: 250,872 (in 2020)
- Governing body: National Park Service and Bureau of Land Management
- Website: Craters of the Moon National Monument and Preserve

Craters of the Moon National Monument and Preserve is a U.S. national monument and national preserve in the Snake River Plain in central Idaho. It is along US 20 (concurrent with US 93 and US 26), between the small towns of Arco and Carey, at an average elevation of 5,900 feet (1,800 m) above sea level.

The Monument was established on May 2, 1924. In November 2000, a presidential proclamation by President Clinton greatly expanded the Monument area. The 410,000-acre National Park Service portions of the expanded Monument were designated as Craters of the Moon National Preserve in August 2002. It spreads across Blaine, Butte, Lincoln, Minidoka, and Power counties. The area is managed cooperatively by the National Park Service and the Bureau of Land Management (BLM).

The Monument and Preserve encompass three major lava fields and about 400 square miles (1,000 km^{2}) of sagebrush steppe grasslands to cover a total area of 1,117 square miles (2,893 km^{2}). The Monument alone covers 343,000 acres (139,000 ha). All three lava fields lie along the Great Rift of Idaho, and among the multiple open rift cracks includes the deepest known on Earth at 800 feet (240 m). On site are variations of basaltic lava, as well as tree molds (cavities left by lava-incinerated trees), lava tubes (a type of cave), and many other volcanic features.

== Geography and geologic setting ==
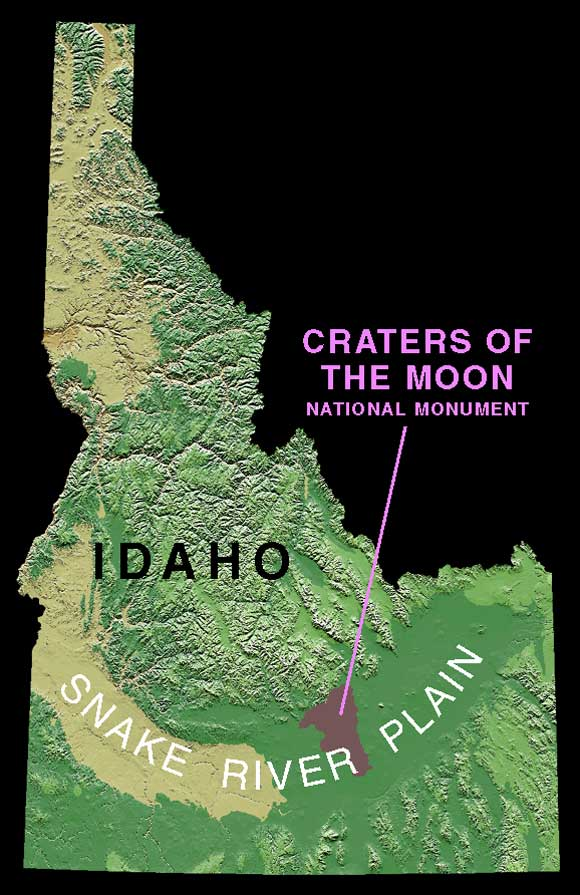
Craters of the Moon within Idaho

Craters of the Moon is in south-central Idaho, midway between Boise and Yellowstone National Park. The lava field reaches southeastward from the Pioneer Mountains. Combined U.S. Highway 20–26–93 cuts through the northwestern part of the monument and provides access to it. However, the rugged landscape of the monument itself remains remote and undeveloped, with only one paved road across the northern end.

The Craters of the Moon Lava Field spreads across 618 square miles (1,601 km^{2}) and is the largest mostly Holocene-aged basaltic lava field in the contiguous United States. The Monument and Preserve contain more than 25 volcanic cones, including outstanding examples of spatter cones. The 60 distinct solidified lava flows that form the Craters of the Moon Lava Field range in age from 15,000 to just 2,000 years. The Kings Bowl and Wapi lava fields, both about 2,200 years old, are part of the National Preserve.

This lava field is the largest of several large beds of lava that erupted from the 53-mile (85 km) south-east to north-west trending Great Rift volcanic zone, a line of weakness in the Earth's crust. Together with fields from other fissures they make up the Lava Beds of Idaho, which in turn are in the much larger Snake River Plain volcanic province. The Great Rift extends across almost the entire Snake River Plain.

Elevation at the visitor center is 5,910 feet (1,800 m) above sea level.

Total average precipitation in the Craters of the Moon area is between 15–20 inches (380–510 mm) per year. (Note: Lower elevation areas near the Snake River average only 10–11 inches (250–280 mm) of precipitation annually.) Most of this is lost in cracks in the basalt, only to emerge later in springs and seeps in the walls of the Snake River Canyon. Older lava fields on the plain support drought-resistant plants such as sagebrush, while younger fields, such as Craters of the Moon, only have a seasonal and very sparse cover of vegetation. When viewed from a distance, this cover disappears almost entirely, giving an impression of utter black desolation. Repeated lava flows over the last 15,000 years have raised the land surface enough to expose it to the prevailing southwesterly winds, which help to keep the area dry. Together these conditions make life on the lava field difficult.

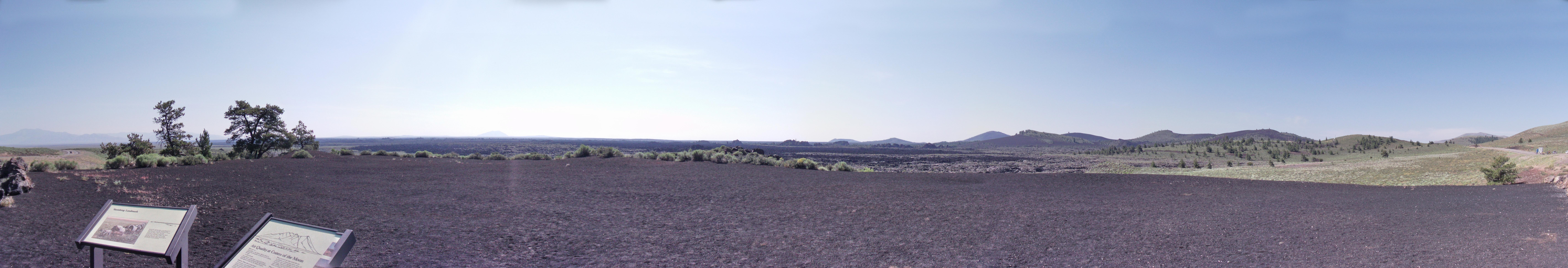
A panoramic image of the Craters of the Moon.

== Climate ==
Climate data for Craters of the Moon, Idaho, 1991–2020 normals, extremes 1958–present
Month	Jan	Feb	Mar	Apr	May	Jun	Jul	Aug	Sep	Oct	Nov	Dec	Year
Record high °F (°C)	51 (11)	60 (16)	68 (20)	83 (28)	90 (32)	100 (38)	101 (38)	100 (38)	96 (36)	86 (30)	67 (19)	52 (11)	101 (38)
Mean maximum °F (°C)	40.4 (4.7)	45.0 (7.2)	57.1 (13.9)	70.6 (21.4)	80.3 (26.8)	88.6 (31.4)	95.2 (35.1)	93.5 (34.2)	87.0 (30.6)	74.0 (23.3)	57.1 (13.9)	42.4 (5.8)	95.9 (35.5)
Mean daily maximum °F (°C)	24.8 (−4.0)	29.1 (−1.6)	39.0 (3.9)	50.2 (10.1)	60.7 (15.9)	70.7 (21.5)	81.5 (27.5)	79.8 (26.6)	69.3 (20.7)	53.6 (12.0)	36.2 (2.3)	24.1 (−4.4)	51.6 (10.9)
Daily mean °F (°C)	16.0 (−8.9)	19.5 (−6.9)	28.6 (−1.9)	37.8 (3.2)	46.8 (8.2)	55.6 (13.1)	65.4 (18.6)	63.4 (17.4)	53.9 (12.2)	40.3 (4.6)	26.0 (−3.3)	16.0 (−8.9)	39.1 (4.0)
Mean daily minimum °F (°C)	7.1 (−13.8)	9.9 (−12.3)	18.3 (−7.6)	25.5 (−3.6)	33.0 (0.6)	40.6 (4.8)	49.3 (9.6)	47.0 (8.3)	38.4 (3.6)	27.1 (−2.7)	15.8 (−9.0)	7.8 (−13.4)	26.7 (−3.0)
Mean minimum °F (°C)	−5.3 (−20.7)	−1.9 (−18.8)	7.7 (−13.5)	17.4 (−8.1)	25.0 (−3.9)	31.7 (−0.2)	42.2 (5.7)	40.0 (4.4)	29.8 (−1.2)	16.1 (−8.8)	4.5 (−15.3)	−5.1 (−20.6)	−10.1 (−23.4)
Record low °F (°C)	−24 (−31)	−19 (−28)	−8 (−22)	6 (−14)	15 (−9)	24 (−4)	30 (−1)	30 (−1)	16 (−9)	−3 (−19)	−13 (−25)	−37 (−38)	−37 (−38)
Average precipitation inches (mm)	1.96 (50)	1.45 (37)	1.13 (29)	1.13 (29)	1.62 (41)	1.21 (31)	0.43 (11)	0.65 (17)	0.83 (21)	1.29 (33)	1.12 (28)	2.19 (56)	15.01 (383)
Average snowfall inches (cm)	20.8 (53)	15.3 (39)	5.4 (14)	4.6 (12)	0.6 (1.5)	0.1 (0.25)	0.0 (0.0)	0.0 (0.0)	0.1 (0.25)	2.0 (5.1)	8.5 (22)	22.9 (58)	80.3 (205.1)
Average extreme snow depth inches (cm)	23.9 (61)	26.5 (67)	22.1 (56)	5.8 (15)	0.2 (0.51)	0.0 (0.0)	0.0 (0.0)	0.0 (0.0)	0.0 (0.0)	1.1 (2.8)	5.5 (14)	15.5 (39)	29.4 (75)
Average precipitation days (≥ 0.01 in)	9.1	7.4	7.0	7.9	9.2	7.2	3.6	4.5	4.7	6.4	7.3	10.1	84.4
Average snowy days (≥ 0.1 in)	7.9	6.6	3.5	1.8	0.6	0.1	0.0	0.0	0.1	0.9	4.4	8.8	34.7
Source 1: NOAA
Source 2: National Weather Service

== History ==
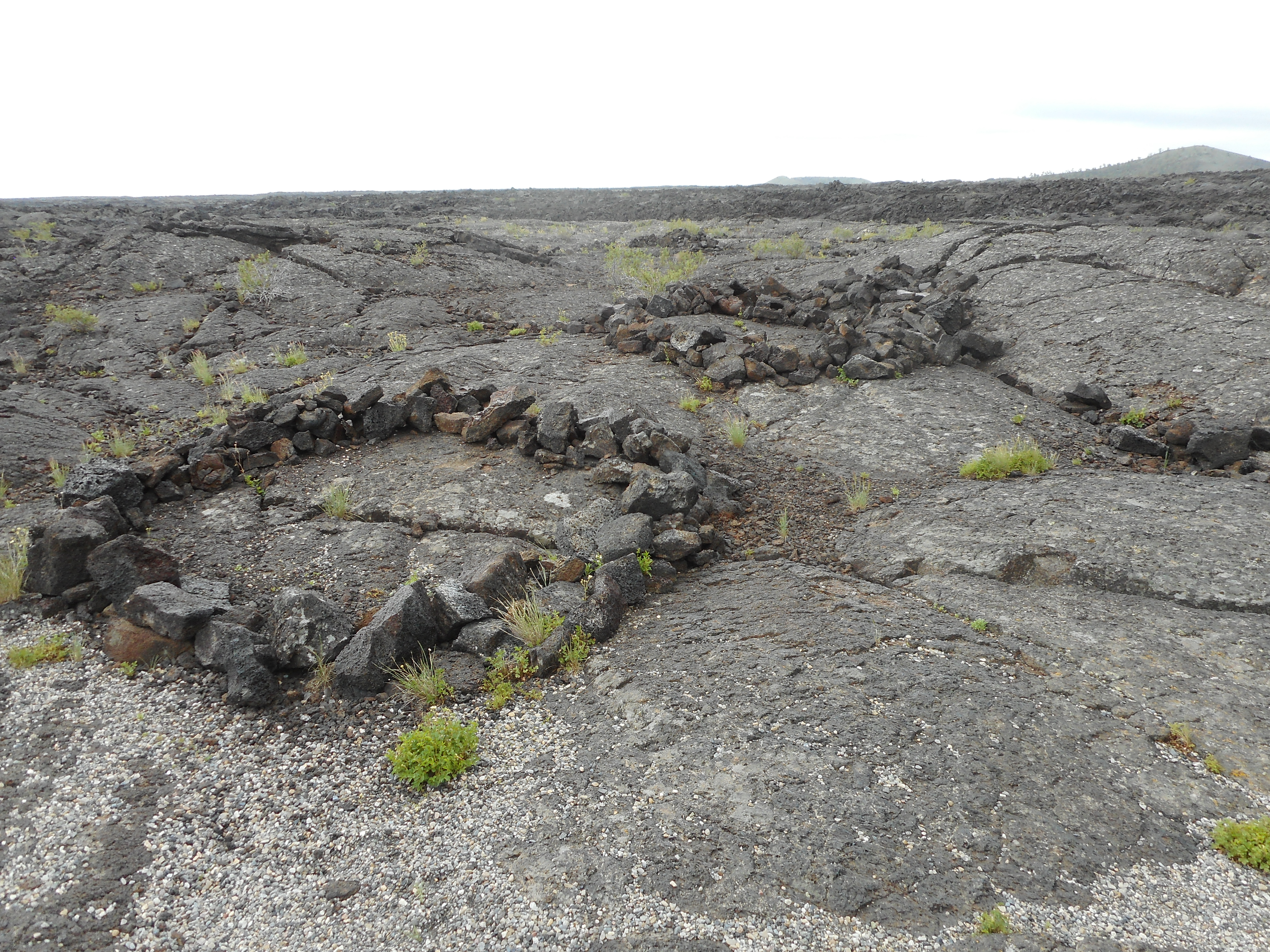
Stone rings near Indian Tunnel lava tubes, possibly windbreaks made by Northern Shoshone passing through the area.

=== Native American history ===
Paleo-Indians visited the area about 12,000 years ago but did not leave much in the way of archaeological evidence. The Northern Shoshone created trails through the Craters of the Moon Lava Field, during their summer migrations from the Snake River to the camas prairie west of the lava field. Stone circles visible near Indian Tunnel were built by the indigenous people. No evidence exists for permanent habitation by any Native American group. A hunter-gatherer culture, the Northern Shoshone subsisted off of the land's bounty; in addition to gathering edible plants, nuts, roots, and berries, numerous game animals were hunted and trapped, both for meat and supplies, as well as for insulating skins and furs. Larger game hides were used in construction of shelters and windbreaks, while the more delicate furs of smaller mammals were often fashioned into many articles of clothing, used to keep warm; smaller trapped and hunted species included animals such as squirrel, red fox, coyote, river otter, raccoon, pine marten, and rabbit, in addition to numerous bird species. For meat and larger hides, they pursued elk, mule deer, pronghorns, black bears, grizzly bears, bison, cougars, and bighorn sheep – large game, which no longer inhabit the immediate area; these species are still present outside of the park, and in other, further remote reaches of the state. At one time, woodland caribou ranged this far south, likely aiding in sustaining the Shoshone. The most recent volcanic eruptions ended about 2,100 years ago and were likely witnessed by the indigenous peoples. Ella E. Clark recorded a Shoshone story that speaks of a serpent on a mountain who, angered by lightning, coiled around and squeezed the mountain until liquid rock flowed, fire shot from cracks, and the mountain exploded.

=== Goodale's Cutoff ===
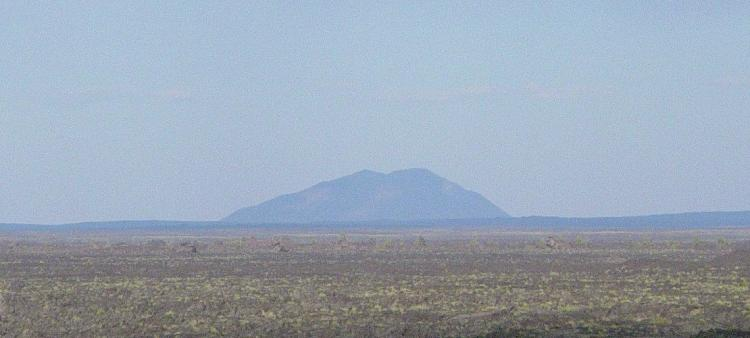
Big Southern Butte was used as a landmark by emigrants on the Oregon Trail.

Emigrants traveling in wagon trains on the Oregon Trail in the 1850s and 1860s followed an alternative route in the area that used trails left by the indigenous peoples which skirted the jagged lava flows. This alternative route was later named Goodale's Cutoff and part of it is in the northern part of the monument. The cutoff was created to reduce the possibility of conflict with the Shoshone along the Snake River such as the skirmish that occurred near modern-day Massacre Rocks State Park.

After gold was discovered in the Salmon River area of Idaho, a group of emigrants persuaded an Illinois-born trapper and trader named Tim Goodale to lead them through the cutoff. A large wagon train left in July 1862 and met up with more wagons at Craters of the Moon Lava Field. Numbering 795 men and 300 women and children, the unusually large group was relatively unmolested during its journey and named the cutoff for their guide. Improvements to the cutoff such as adding a ferry to cross the Snake River made it into a popular alternative route of the Oregon Trail.

=== Exploration and early study ===
U.S. Army captain and western explorer B.L.E. Bonneville visited the lava fields and other places in the Western U.S. in the 19th century and wrote about his experiences in his diaries. Washington Irving later used Bonneville's diaries to write the Adventures of Captain Bonneville, saying this unnamed lava field is a place "where nothing meets the eye but a desolate and awful waste, where no grass grows nor water runs, and where nothing is to be seen but lava".

In 1879, two Arco cattlemen named Arthur Ferris and J.W. Powell became the first known European-Americans to explore the lava fields. They were investigating its possible use for grazing and watering cattle but found the area to be unsuitable and left.

In 1901 and 1903, Israel Russell became the first geologist to study this area while surveying it for the United States Geological Survey (USGS). In 1910, Samuel Paisley continued Russell's work and later would become the monument's first custodian. Others followed and in time much of the mystery surrounding this and the other lava beds of Idaho was lifted.

The few European emigrants who visited the area in the 19th century created local legends that it looked like the surface of the Moon. Geologist Harold T. Stearns coined the name "Craters of the Moon" in 1923 while trying to convince the National Park Service to recommend protection of the area in a national monument.

=== Limbert's expedition ===
Robert Limbert, a taxidermist, tanner, photographer, filmmaker, and exhibit designer from Boise, first came to the area in 1918 after hearing stories from fur trappers about "strange things they had seen while ranging the region". In the early 1920s, he explored and mapped the area, which he described as "practically unknown and unexplored..".

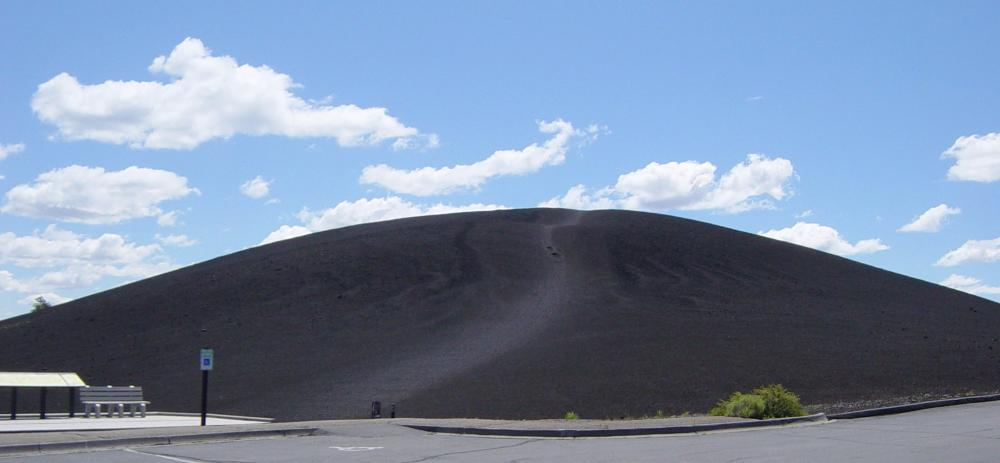
The black soil on Inferno Cone exhibits the properties Limbert wrote about.

I had made two trips into the northern end, covering practically the same region as that traversed by a Geological Survey party in 1901. My first was a hiking and camping trip with Ad Santel (the wrestler), Dr. Dresser, and Albert Jones; the second was with Wes Watson and Era Martin (ranchers living about four miles from the northern edge). The peculiar features seen on those trips led me to take a third across the region in the hope that even more interesting phenomena might be encountered.

— Robert Limbert, Among the "Craters of the Moon"

Limbert set out on his third and most ambitious foray to the area in May 1920, this time with W.L. Cole and an Airedale terrier to accompany him. Starting from Minidoka, Idaho, they explored what is now the park from south to north, passing Two Point Butte, Echo Crater, Big Craters, North Crater Flow, and out of the lava field through the Yellowstone Park and Lincoln Highway (now known as the Old Arco-Carey Road). Taking the dog along was a mistake, Limbert wrote, "for after three days' travel his feet were worn and bleeding". Many of the names Limbert gave to formations and places during his travels are still in use.

A series of newspaper and magazine articles written by Limbert were later published about this and previous treks, which increased public awareness of the area. The most famous of these was an article that appeared in a 1924 issue of National Geographic where he called the area "Craters of the Moon", helping to solidify the use of that name. In the article, he wrote about the beauty of the cobalt blue of the Blue Dragon Flow:

It is the play of light at sunset across this lava that charms the spectator. It becomes a twisted, wavy sea. In the moonlight its glazed surface has a silvery sheen. With changing conditions of light and air, it varies also, even while one stands and watches. It is a place of color and silence...

— Robert Limbert, Among the "Craters of the Moon"

The only visitor center in Craters of the Moon, the Robert Limbert Visitor Center, was named after him in 1990.

=== Protection and later history ===
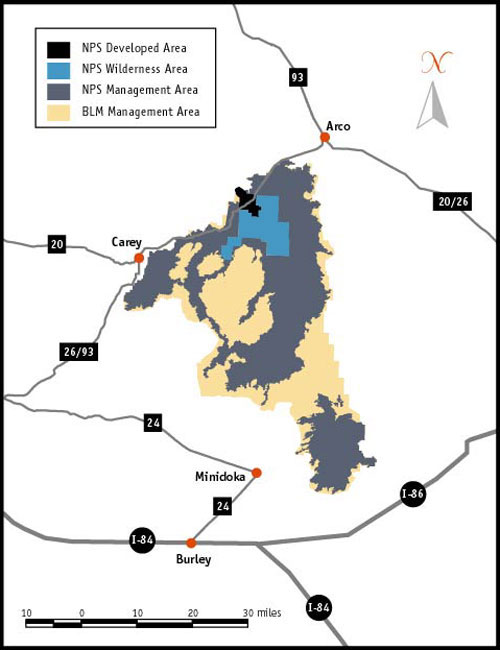
Craters of the Moon management areas. Together, the developed area (black) and NPS Wilderness (blue) made up the 1970 to 2000 extent of the monument.

In large part due to Limbert's work, Craters of the Moon National Monument was proclaimed on May 2, 1924, by U.S. President Calvin Coolidge to preserve the "weird and scenic landscape" of the area. The Craters Inn and several cabins were built in 1927 for the convenience of visitors. The Mission 66 program initiated construction of today's road system, visitor center, bookstore, campground, and comfort station in 1956, and in 1959 the Craters of the Moon Natural History Association was formed to assist the monument in educational activities. The addition of an island of vegetation completely surrounded by lava known as Carey Kipuka increased the size of the monument by 5,360 acres (22 km^{2}) in 1962.

Since then, the park has been expanded. On October 23, 1970, Congress set aside a large part of the monument—43,243 acres (175 km^{2})—as Craters of the Moon Wilderness, protecting that part under the National Wilderness Preservation System. Along with Petrified Forest Wilderness, this became one of the first two designations on land administered by the National Park Service.

From 1969 to 1972, NASA visited the Moon through the Apollo program and found that its surface does not closely resemble this part of Idaho. While the Moon's craters are largely impact craters, those seen at Craters of the Moon were instead created by volcanic eruptions. Apollo astronauts Alan Shepard, Edgar Mitchell, Eugene Cernan, and Joe Engle performed part of their training at Craters of the Moon Lava Field by learning to look for and collect good rock specimens in an unfamiliar and harsh environment.

For many years, geologists, biologists and environmentalists have advocated for the expansion of the protected area and its transformation into a national park. Part of that goal was reached in 2000 when the monument was expanded 13-fold, from 53,545 acres (217 km^{2}) to its current size, to encompass the entire Great Rift zone and its three lava fields. Opposition by cattle interests and hunters to a simple expansion plan led to a compromise of having the National Park Service portion of the addition, which comprises the lava flows, become a national preserve in 2002 (which allows hunting, not ordinarily permitted in national parks and monuments in the U.S.).

In 2017, the monument was designated an International Dark Sky Park by DarkSky International due to its exceptional preservation of its naturally dark night skies.

Craters of the Moon National Monument and Preserve is co-managed by the National Park Service and the Bureau of Land Management (BLM), both under the Department of the Interior; the BLM managing the non-lava grasslands. In March 2017, the Idaho Senate voted in favor of petitioning Congress to designate Craters of the Moon a national park.

== Geology ==
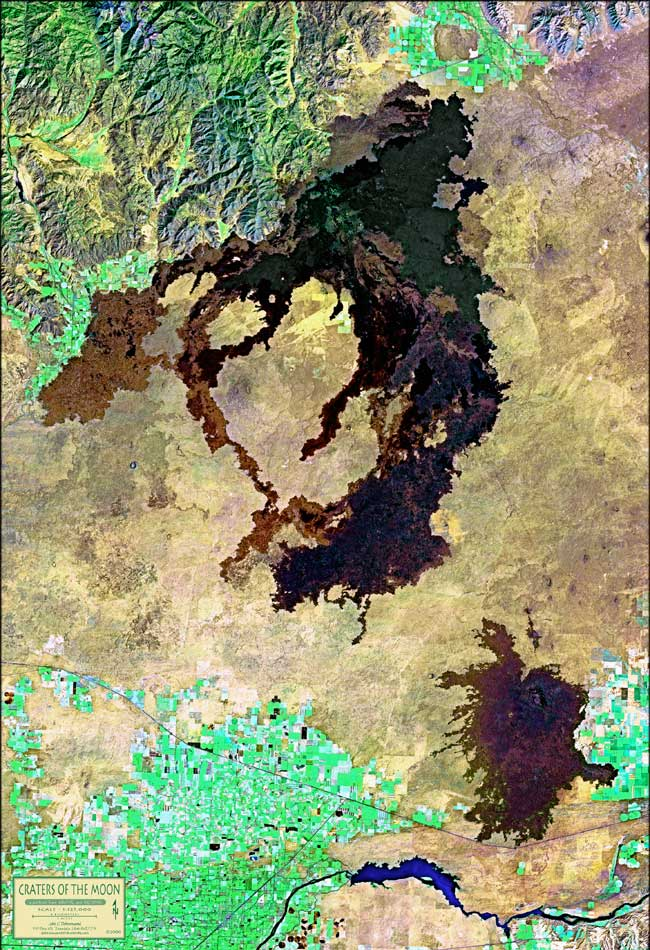
Landsat satellite image showing the entire Great Rift volcanic zone and three distinct lava fields.

The Snake River Plain is a volcanic province that was created by a series of cataclysmic caldera-forming eruptions which started about 16 million years ago. The hotspot under the Yellowstone Caldera in Yellowstone National Park has been implicated. This hotspot was under the Craters of the Moon area some 10 to 11 million years ago but "moved" as the North American Plate migrated northwestward. (Note: Meaning that Craters of the Moon once looked like Yellowstone does today and Yellowstone will one day look much like Craters of the Moon does now. The hot spot stays in the same place while the overlying continent of North America moves. (NPS 1991, pp. 7–12)) Pressure from the hotspot heaves the land surface up, creating fault-block mountains. After the hotspot passes the pressure is released and the land subsides.

Leftover heat from this hotspot was later liberated by basin and range-associated rifting and created the many overlapping lava flows that make up the lava beds of Idaho. The largest rift zone is the Great Rift, and it is from this "Great Rift fissure system" that the Craters of the Moon, King's Bowl, and Wapi lava fields were created. The Great Rift is a National Natural Landmark.

In spite of their fresh appearance, the oldest flows in the Craters of the Moon Lava Field are 15,000 years old and the youngest erupted about 2,100 years ago, according to Mel Kuntz and other USGS geologists. Nevertheless, the volcanic fissures at Craters of the Moon are considered to be dormant, not extinct, and are expected to erupt again in less than 1,000 years. There are eight major eruptive periods recognized in the Craters of the Moon Lava Field. Each period lasted about 1000 years or less and were separated by relatively quiet periods that lasted between 500 and 3,000 years. Individual lava flows traveled up to 30 miles (50 km) with the Blue Dragon Flow being the longest.

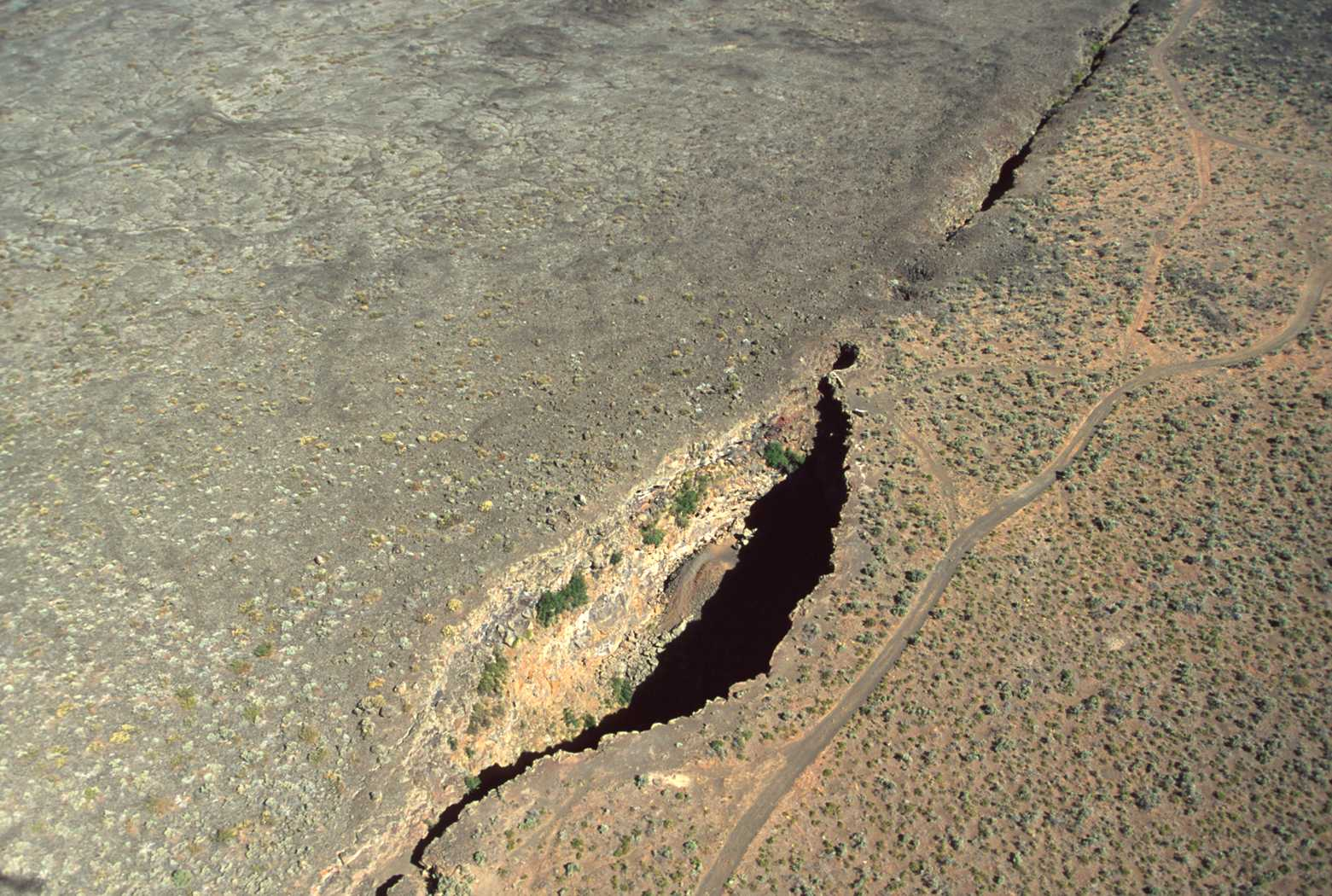
King's Bowl and part of the Great Rift from air. King's Bowl is a phreatic explosion pit 280 feet (90 m) long, 100 feet (30 m) wide, and at least 600 feet (183 m) deep, caused by lava meeting groundwater and producing a steam explosion 2,200 years ago.

King's Bowl Lava Field erupted during a single fissure eruption on the southern part of the Great Rift about 2,250 years ago. This eruption probably lasted only a few hours to a few days. The field preserves explosion pits, lava lakes, squeeze-ups, basalt mounds, and an ash blanket. The Wapi Lava Field probably formed from a fissure eruption at the same time as the King's Bowl eruption. More prolonged activity over a period of months to a few years led to the formation of low shield volcanoes in the Wapi field. The Bear Trap Cave lava tube, between the Craters of the Moon and the Wapi lava fields, is a cave system more than 15 miles (24 km) long. The lava tube is remarkable for its length and for the number of well-preserved lava cave features, such as lava stalactites and curbs, the latter marking high stands of the flowing lava frozen on the lava tube walls. The lava tubes and pit craters of the park are known for their preservation of winter ice and snow into the hot summer months due to shielding from the sun and the insulating properties of basalt.

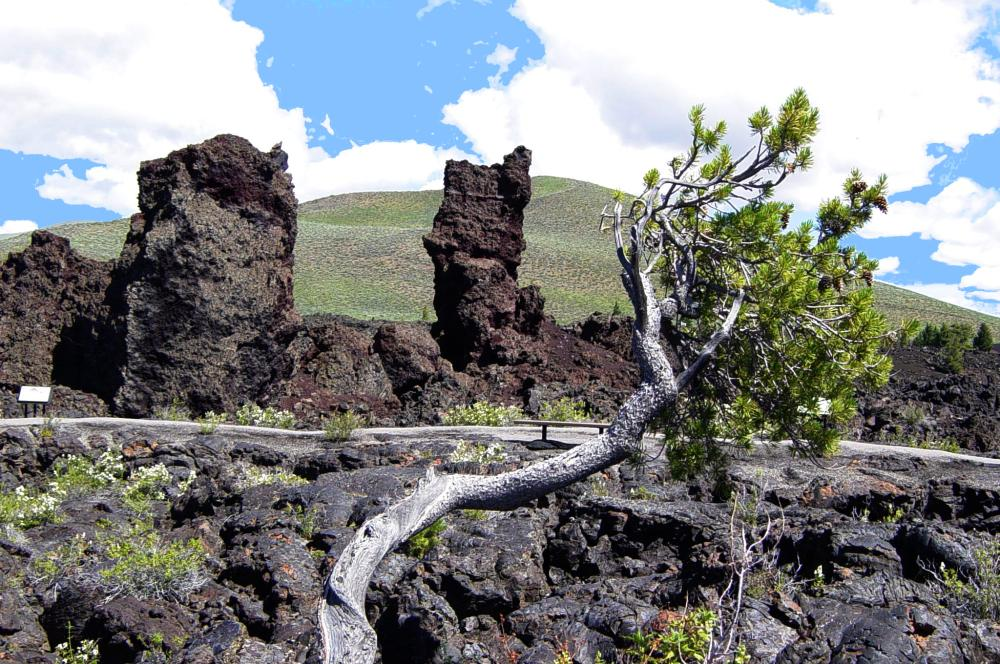
Cinder crags from North Crater on the North Crater Flow.

A typical eruption along the Great Rift and similar basaltic rift systems starts with a curtain of very fluid lava shooting up to 1,000 feet (300 m) high along a segment of the rift up to 1 mile (1.6 km) long. As the eruption continues, pressure and heat decrease, and the chemistry of the lava becomes slightly more silica-rich. The curtain of lava responds by breaking apart into separate vents. Various types of volcanoes may form at these vents: gas-rich, pulverized lava creates cinder cones, and pasty lava blobs form spatter cones. Later stages of an eruption push lava streams out through the side or base of cinder cones, which usually ends the life of the cinder cone (North Crater, Watchman, and the Sheep Trail Buttes are notable exceptions). This will sometimes breach part of the cone and carry it away as large and craggy blocks of cinder. Solid crust forms over lava streams and lava tubes are created when lava vacates its course.

Geologists feared that a large earthquake that shook Borah Peak, Idaho's tallest mountain, in 1983 would restart volcanic activity at Craters of the Moon, though this proved not to be the case. Geologists predict that the area will experience its next eruption sometime in the next 900 years, with activity most likely to occur within the next 100 years. (Note: Eruptions were dated using paleomagnetic and radiocarbon methods, which together give dates that are considered accurate to within 100 years (NPS 1991, pp. 28–29). Both tests were conducted in 1980 by using charred vegetation directly below individual flows (for the radiocarbon test), and from rock core samples (for the paleomagnetic work).)

== Biology ==
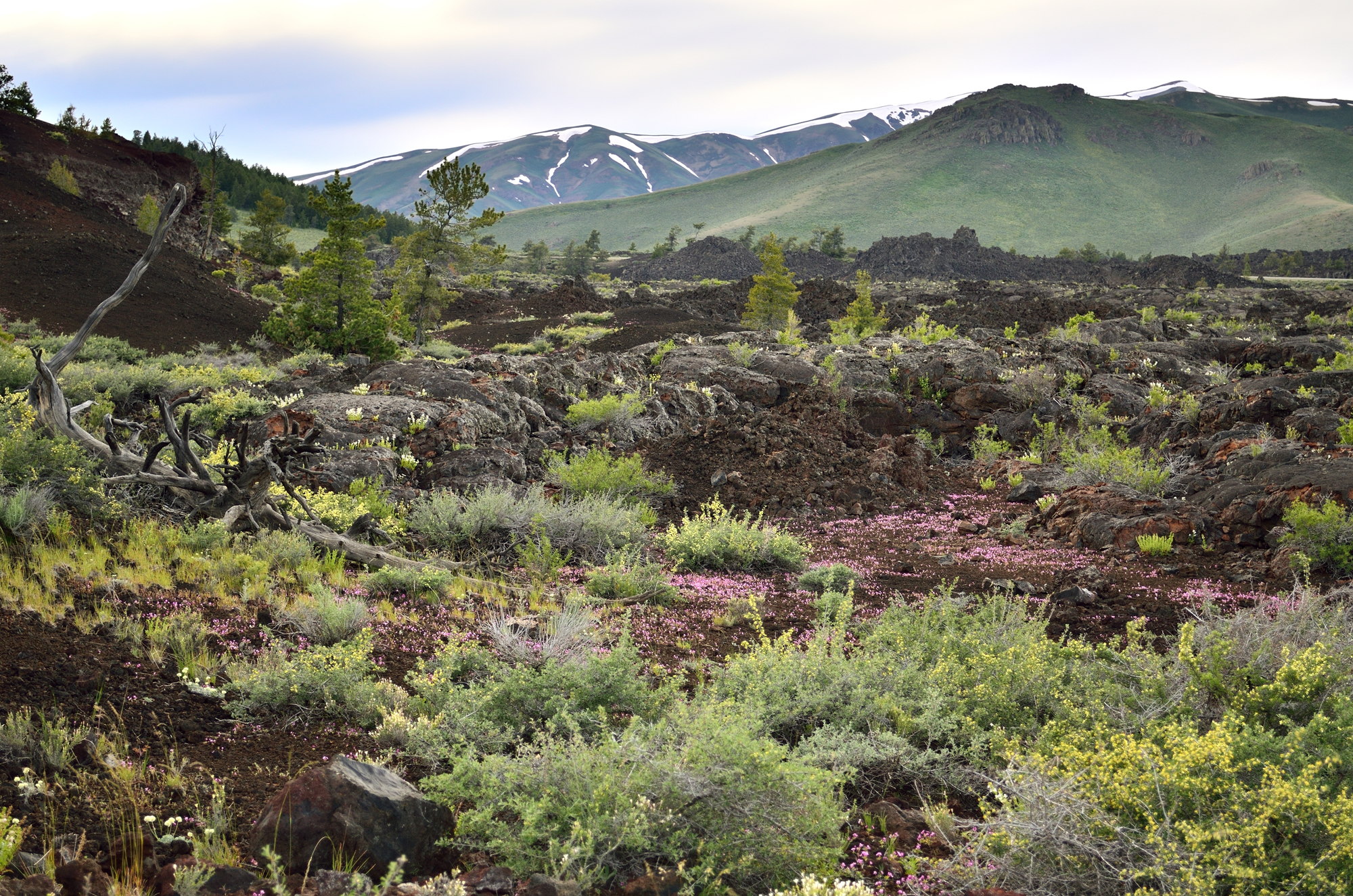
Landscape, Craters of the Moon National Monument and Preserve.

=== Conditions ===
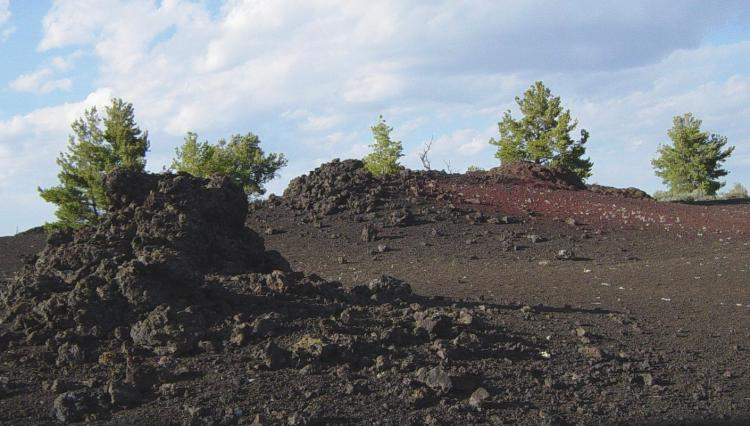
This scoria field shows typical conditions at Craters of the Moon.

All organisms that live in and around Craters of the Moon are under great environmental stress due to constant dry winds and heat-absorbing black lavas that tend to quickly sap water from living things. Summer soil temperatures often exceed 150 °F (66 °C) and plant cover is generally less than 5% on cinder cones and about 15% over the entire park. Adaptation is therefore necessary for survival in this semi-arid harsh climate.

Water is usually only found deep inside holes at the bottom of blow-out craters. Animals therefore get most or all of the moisture they need directly from their food. The black soil on and around cinder cones does not hold moisture for long, making it difficult for plants to establish themselves. Soil particles first develop from direct rock decomposition by lichens and typically collect in crevices in lava flows. Successively more complex plants then colonize the microhabitat created by the increasingly productive soil.

The shaded north slopes of cinder cones provide more protection from direct sunlight and prevailing southwesterly winds and have a more persistent snow cover (an important water source in early spring). These parts of cinder cones are therefore colonized by plants first.

Gaps between lava flows were sometimes cut off from surrounding vegetation. These literal islands of habitat are called kīpukas, a Hawaiian word describing older land surrounded by younger lava. Carey Kīpuka is one such area in the southernmost part of the monument and is used as a benchmark to measure how plant cover has changed in less pristine parts of southern Idaho.

=== Plants ===
There are over 600 species of plants known to grow in the park which make up 93 plant communities. When wildflowers are not in bloom, most of the vegetation is found in semi-hidden pockets and consists of pine trees, junipers, and sagebrush. Strategies used by plants to cope with the adverse conditions include:

- Drought tolerance by physiological adaptations such as the ability to survive extreme dehydration or the ability to extract water from very dry soil. Sagebrush and antelope bitterbrush are examples.
- Drought avoidance by having small, hairy, or succulent leaves to minimize moisture loss or otherwise conserve water. Hairs on scorpionweed, the succulent parts of the prickly pear cactus, and the small leaves of the wirelettuce are all local examples.

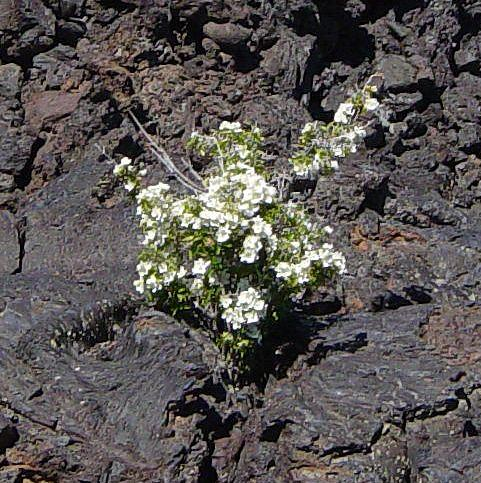
Syringa growing from a crack in the North Crater lava flow.

- Drought escape by growing in small crevices or near persistent water supplies, or by staying dormant for about 95% of the year. Mosses and ferns in the area grow near constant water sources such as natural potholes and seeps from ice caves. Scabland penstemon, dwarf mountain fleabane, and gland cinquefoil grow in shallow crevices. Syringa, bush rockspirea, fernbush, and even limber pines grow in larger crevices. Dwarf monkeyflowers carry out their entire life cycle during the brief wet part of the year and survive in seed form the rest of the year.

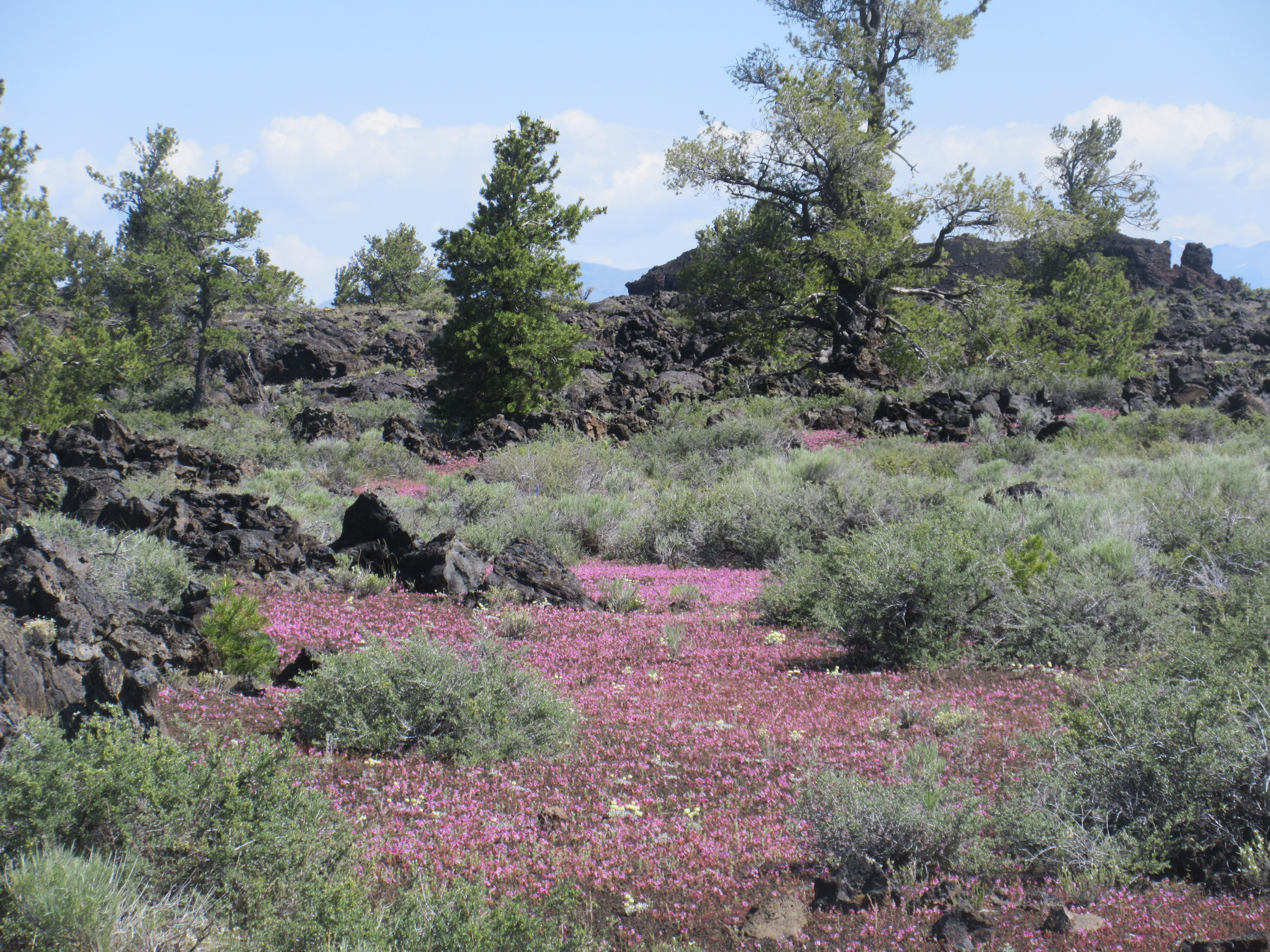
Wildflower bloom on the Devils Orchard trail.

A plant commonly seen on the cinder flats is dwarf buckwheat (Eriogonum ovalifolium var. depressum), a flowering plant 4 inches (10 cm) tall with a root system 3 feet (0.91 m) wide. The root system monopolizes soil moisture in its immediate area, resulting in individual plants that are evenly spaced. Consequently, many visitors ask park rangers if the buckwheat were systematically planted.

Wildflowers bloom from early May to late September but most are gone by late August. Moisture from snowmelt along with some rainfall in late spring kick-starts the germination of annual plants, including wildflowers. Most of these plants complete their entire life cycle in the few months each year that moisture levels are good. The onset of summer decreases the number of wildflowers and by autumn only the tiny yellow flowers of sagebrush and rabbitbrush remain. Some wildflowers that grow in the area are arrowleaf balsamroot, bitterroot, blazingstar, turpentine parsley, dwarf monkeyflower, Indian paintbrush, scorpionweed, scabland penstemon, and wild onion.

=== Animals ===
Years of cataloging by biologists and park rangers have recorded more than 2000 species of insects, 12 reptiles, 203 birds, 59 mammals, and three amphibians. Birds and rodents are seen most frequently in the Craters of the Moon area. Grizzly bears, bison, and bighorn sheep once roamed this area but have long ago become locally extinct. 11 species of bats have been recorded in Craters of the Moon with as many as five others potentially occurring in the park. Nearly all of these bat species have been documented hibernating within the park's boundaries, typically making use of the area's numerous lava tubes, making it an important bat habitat. Traditional livestock grazing continues within the grass/shrublands administered by the Bureau of Land Management.

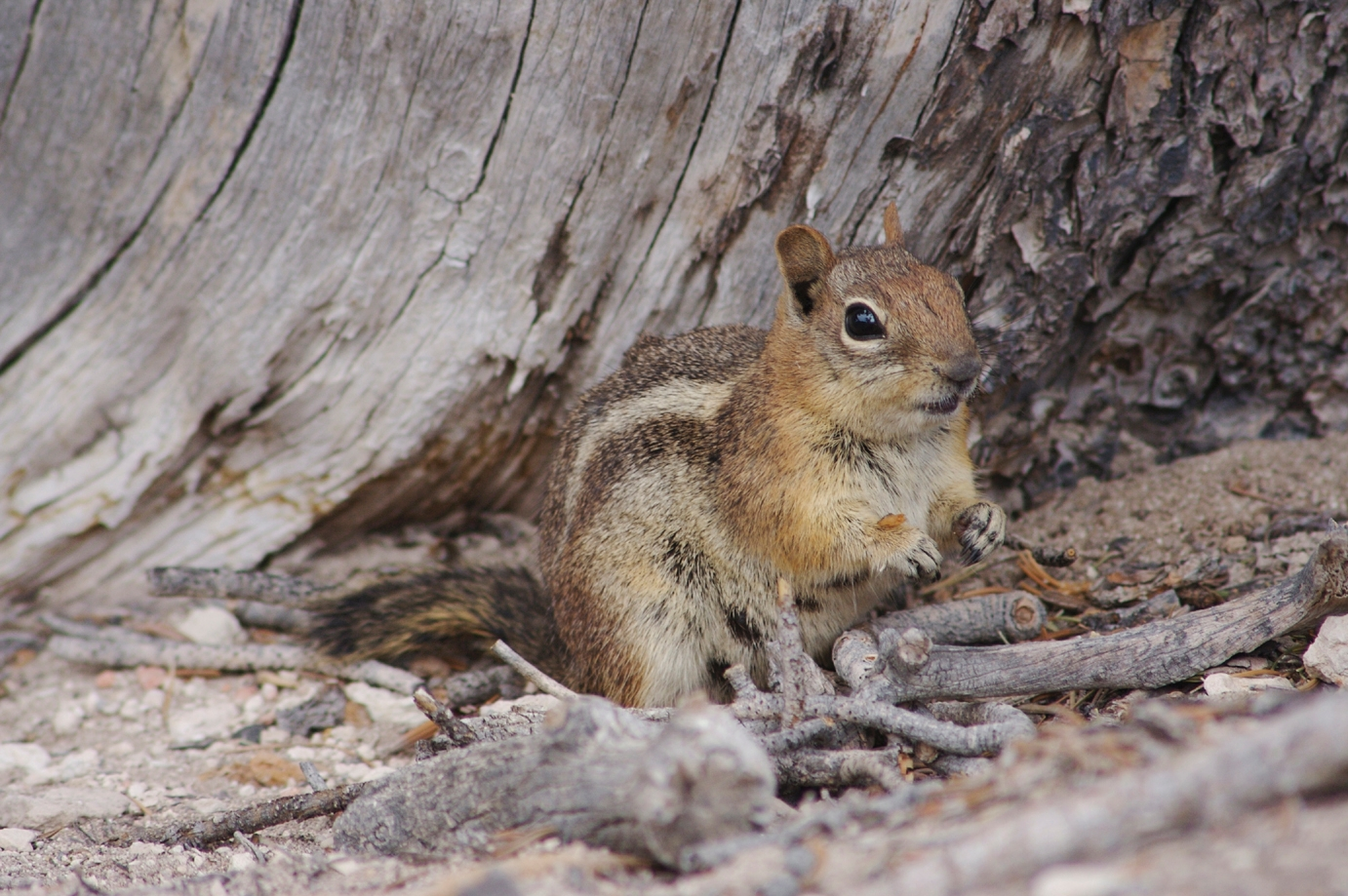
A golden-mantled ground squirrel, one of the most common animals to see in the park.

Most desert animals are nocturnal, or mainly active at night. Nocturnal behavior is an adaptation to both predation and hot summer daytime temperatures. Nocturnal animals at Craters of the Moon include woodrats, skunks, foxes, bobcats, mountain lions, bats, nighthawks, owls, and most other small, desert rodents.

Animals that are most active at dawn and dusk, when temperatures are cooler than mid-day, are called crepuscular. The subdued morning and evening light helps make them less visible to predators but is bright enough to allow them to locate food. Some animals are crepuscular mainly because their prey is. Crepuscular animals in the area include mule deer, coyotes, porcupines, mountain cottontails, jackrabbits, and many songbirds.

Some desert animals are diurnal, or primarily active during the day. These include ground squirrels, marmots, chipmunks, lizards, snakes, hawks, and eagles.

Many animals have a specific temperature range where they are active, meaning the times they are active vary with the seasons. Snakes and lizards brumate during the winter months, are diurnal during the late spring and early fall, and become crepuscular during the heat of summer. Many insects and some birds also alter their times of activity. Some animals, like ground squirrels and marmots, have one or more periods of estivation, a summer hibernation that allows them to avoid the hottest and driest periods.

Unique populations of Great Basin pocket mouse, American pika, and yellow-pine chipmunk are found at Craters of the Moon and nowhere else. Lava tube beetles and other cave-dwelling invertebrates are found only in the lava tubes of eastern Idaho.

==== Pronghorn migration ====
Pronghorn migration across the northern Snake River Plain has been monitored since the Lava Lake Institute along with the Wildlife Conservation Society, Idaho Department of Fish and Game, and the Pioneers Alliance conducted a study of their movements from 2008 to 2010. Pronghorns from the Pioneer Mountains were fitted with radio collars to track their movements throughout the year. These studies showed that in the spring and fall, the animals travel about 100 miles (160 km) one-way along the southern edges of the mountains to reach their summer and winter ranges. In the winter, they join the largest wintering herd in Idaho on the Big Desert/Idaho National Laboratory range.

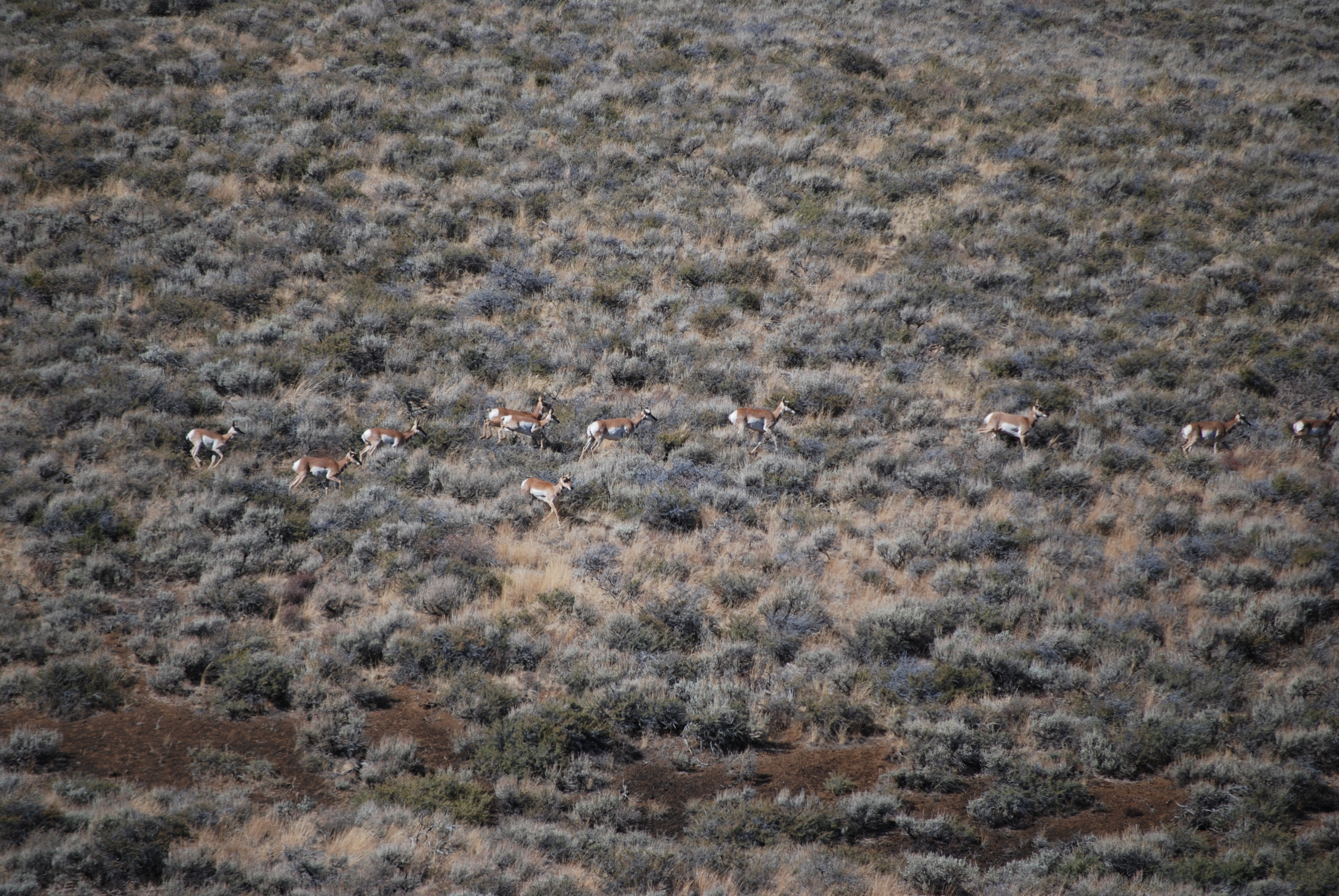
A herd of pronghorns migrating through the northern part of Craters of the Moon.

The narrowest part of this migration corridor is in the northern part of Craters of the Moon where pronghorns typically follow a single trail for about 8 miles (13 km). Archaeological evidence suggests local indigenous peoples such as the Shoshone and Bannock knew about this route and likely conducted seasonal pronghorn hunts in this area coinciding with pronghorn migration. Due to the narrow size of this natural funnel, the National Park Service has monitored the number of pronghorns migrating through this area using motion-sensitive trail cameras since 2012. While an average of 400 pronghorns make the migration each season, as many as 700 animals have been counted in a single migration.

As a result of the initial study, the National Park Service conducted a survey of its boundary fence and found that the fence along the northern section of Craters of the Moon interfered with pronghorn migration where it intersected the route. While the fence was originally erected to prevent neighboring livestock from entering the park, the survey found that the types of fencing used made it extremely difficult for animals to slip under it. When confronted with a fence, pronghorns typically crawl under it rather than try to jump over. The fence was also difficult for other animals to jump over.

From 2009 to 2017, the park service worked with the Utah Conservation Corps to reconstruct the boundary fence in this area as well as another area several miles northeast to be wildlife friendly. This included removing some fence segments and implementing gates and drop panels where possible.

==== Mule deer ====
In May 1980, wildlife researcher Brad Griffith of the University of Idaho started a three-year study to mark and count the mule deer in the monument. The National Park Service was concerned that the local herd might grow so large that it would damage its habitat. It was found that this group of mule deer had developed a drought-evasion strategy unique for its species.

The deer arrive in the southern part of the pre-2000 extent of the monument mid-April each year once winter snows have melted away enough to allow for foraging. Griffith found that by late summer plants in the area have already matured and dried to the point that they can no longer provide enough moisture to sustain the deer. In late July after about 12 days above 80 °F (27 °C) and warm nights above 50 °F (10 °C) the herd migrates 5 to 10 miles (8.0 to 16.1 km) north to the Pioneer Mountains to obtain water from free-flowing streams and shade themselves in aspen and Douglas fir groves. Rain in late September prompts the herd to return to the monument to feed on bitterbrush until snow in November triggers them to migrate back to their winter range. This herd, therefore, has a dual summer range. It is also very productive with one of the highest fawn survival rates of any herd in the species.

Afternoon winds usually die down in the evening, prompting behavioral modifications in the herd. The deer avoid the dry wind by being more active at night when the wind is not blowing. In 1991 there was a three-year average of 420 mule deer.

== Recreational activities ==
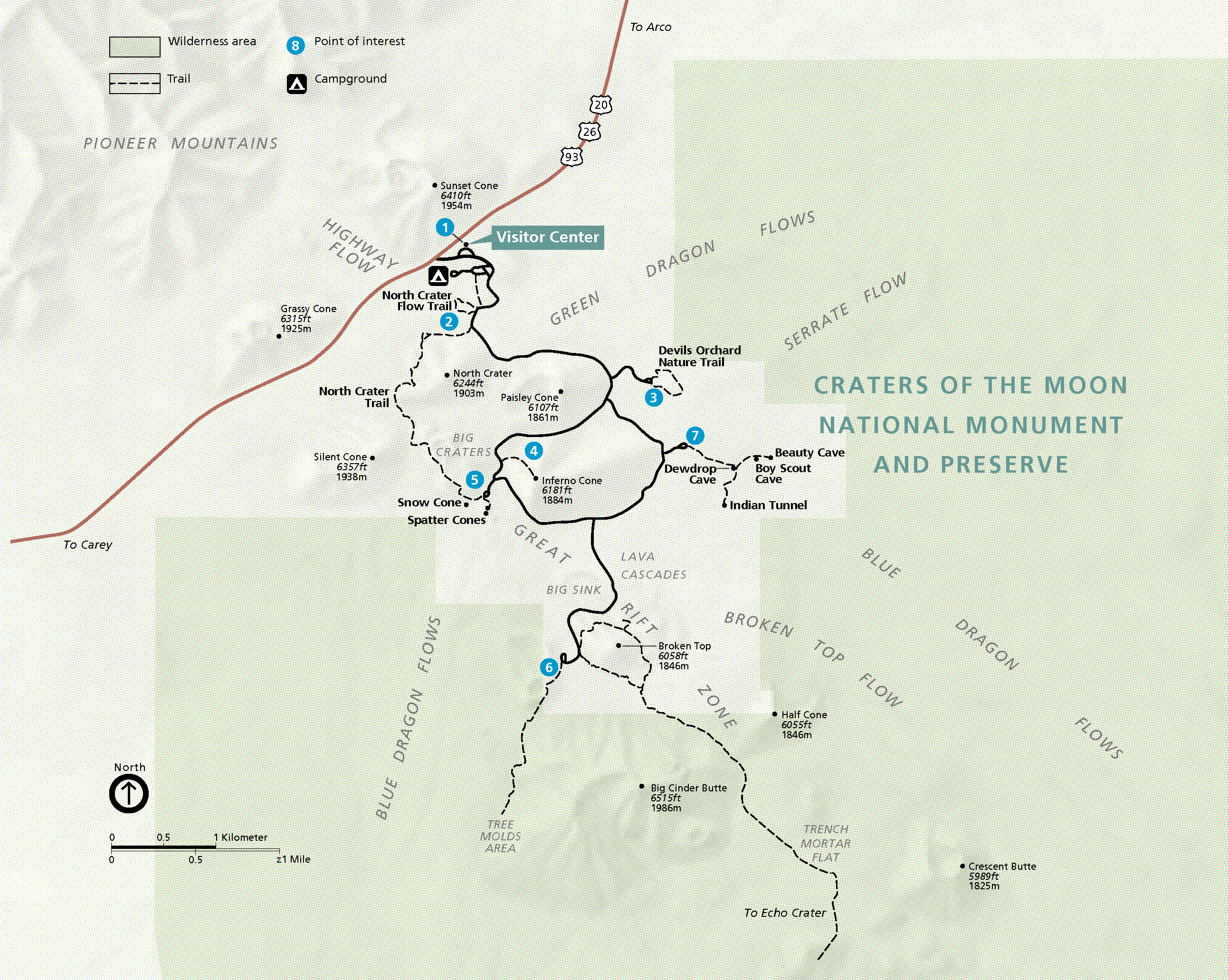
Craters of the Moon Loop Road map.

A wide variety of volcanic formations and features are accessible from the Loop Road, the only developed area of the park. Wildflowers, shrubs, trees, and wildlife can be seen by hiking on one of the many trails in the monument or by just pulling over into one of the turn-offs. More rugged hiking opportunities are available in the Craters of the Moon backcountry areas, away from the Loop Road.

1. Visitor Center: The Robert Limbert Visitor Center is located at the entrance to the scenic Loop Road. Various displays and publications are available along with a short film about the geology and history of the area help to orient visitors. Ranger-led walks and other programs are available in the summer and cover topics such as history, wildlife, plants, or geology.
2. North Crater Flow Trail: An easy, paved trail less than 1/4 mile (400 m) long crosses the lava flow for which this trail is named. This lava flow erupted from neighboring North Crater cinder cone and is one of the youngest lava flows of the Craters of the Moon lava field. This is one of the places visitors can view the Blue Dragon Flow, a lava flow named for the purplish-blue tint on its surface. Good examples of pahoehoe, a'a, and some block lava are readily visible along with large, rafted crater wall fragments called the Monoliths. The Monoliths were once part of a cinder cone which was ripped apart when the volcano's lava-filled crater was breached. North Crater Trail, a separate trail, begins 100 yards (91 m) past the North Crater Flow trailhead. This strenuous, 1.8 miles (2.9 km) long trail continues into North Crater, around Big Craters, and ends at the Spatter Cones parking lot.
3. Devils Orchard Nature Trail: Devils Orchard is a group of lava-transported cinder cone fragments (or rafted blocks) that stand in cinders. Like the Monoliths at North Crater Flow, they were once part of the North Crater cinder cone but broke off during an eruption. A paved, accessible, 0.5 miles (0.80 km) long loop trail through these formations and trees of the "orchard" is available. Interpretive displays can be read along the trail.
4. Inferno Cone: This stop hosts a short, steep trail up to the top of the cinder cone which provides an overlook of the entire monument. From there, the Spatter Cones can be seen just to the southwest along with the line of cinder cones along the Great Rift. In the distance is Big Cinder Butte. At over 700 feet (210 m) tall, it is one of the world's largest, purely basaltic cinder cones. Further away are the Pioneer Mountains just north of the highway, and beyond the park are the White Knob Mountains, the Lost River Range, and the Lemhi Range. On the clearest days, the tops of the Tetons may be seen, about 138 miles (222 km) to the east.
5. Spatter Cones: Both the Spatter Cones and Big Craters sit directly along part of one of the fissures of the Great Rift. Spatter cones are created by accumulations of pasty, gas-poor lava as they erupt from a vent. Two of the Spatter Cones in this area can be accessed by short trails where visitors can look inside the cones. Big Craters is a cinder cone complex visitors can hike along the rim of about 100 feet (30 m) above a short, steep trail.
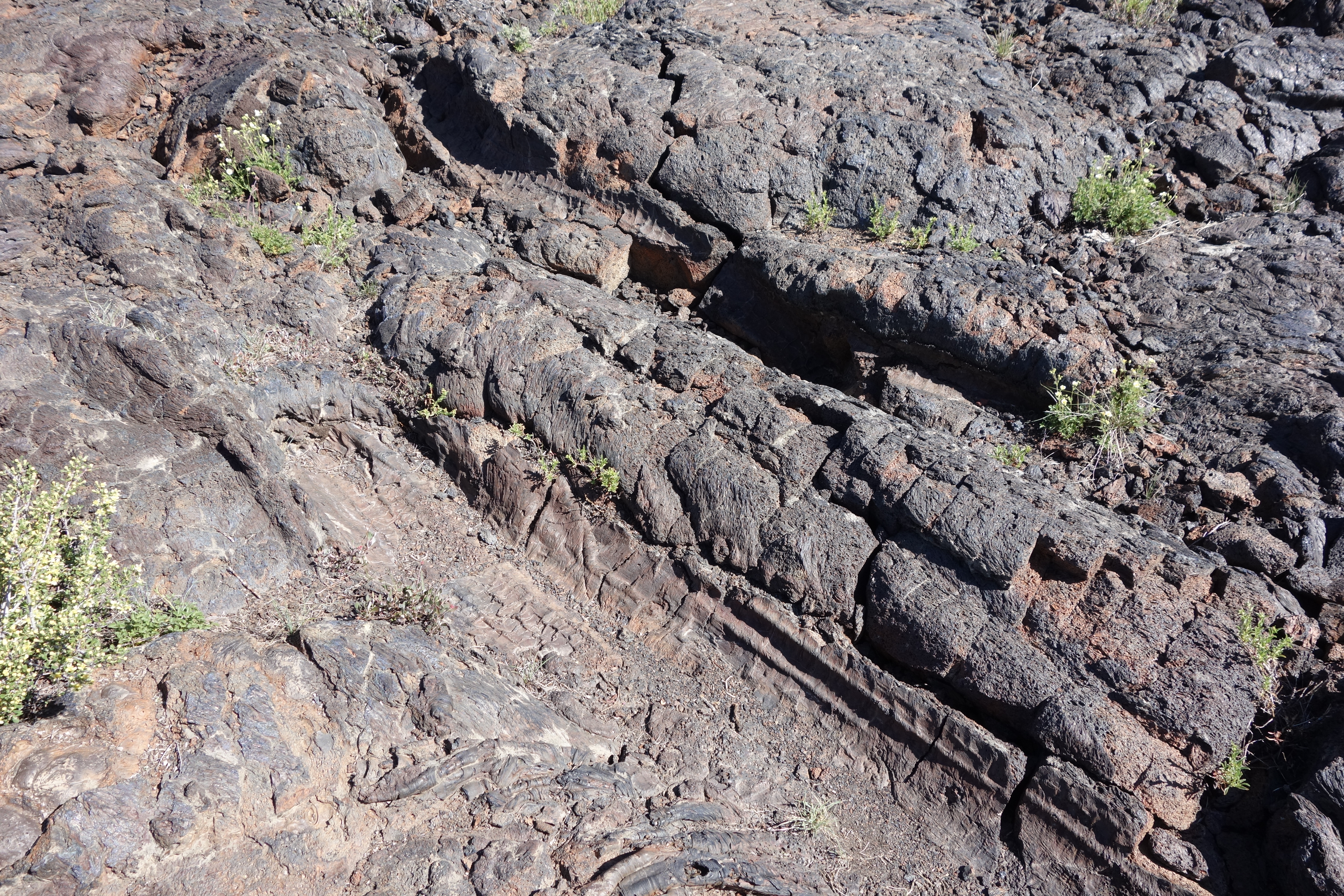
  Tree mold showing an impression of a tree trunk and bark in the basalt on the Tree Molds Trail at Craters of the Moon.
6. Tree Molds: The Tree Molds Trail is an area where lava flows overran part of a forest. The trees were incinerated but as some of them burned they released enough water to cool the lava to form an impression. Some of these casts survived the eruption and mark the exact location and shape of the burning trees in the lava. Both holes and horizontal molds were left, some still showing shapes indicative of bark. Tree molds are visible at the end of the Tree Molds Trail, 1 mile (1.6 km) from the parking area. The Wilderness Trail also leaves from this parking lot and extends nearly 4 miles (6.4 km) into the Craters of the Moon Wilderness before gradually disappearing near The Sentinel cinder cone. The 1.8 miles (2.9 km) Broken Top Loop trail is the third trail that begins at this area and encircles the youngest cinder cone in the park and can be done separately or as part of a longer trek on the Wilderness Trail. This trail features some of the greatest geological and ecological diversity of any trail in the park. A pull-off on the spur road leading to the Tree Molds area showcases the Lava Cascades, a lava river created from the Blue Dragon Flow that temporarily pooled in Big Sink, a former lava lake.
7. Caves Area: The final stop on Loop Road which, as the name suggests, features a collection of lava tubes. Formed from one of the most recent lava flows, the caves are a 0.8 miles (1.3 km) walk from the parking lot and include Dewdrop Cave and Indian Tunnel. The caves are open to visitors in the summer, but a free permit is required to enter. Flashlights are needed in Dewdrop Cave and strongly recommended for Indian Tunnel. None of the caves are developed beyond the entrances and require climbing or scrambling over loose rocks. Lava tubes are created when the sides and surface of a lava flow hardens. If the fluid interior flows away, a cave is left behind.

The Lava Flow Campground has 41 first come, first served sites. Camping facilities are basic but do include seasonal water, restrooms, charcoal grills, and trash containers. National Park Service rangers present evening programs at the campground amphitheater in the summer.

The park has a Junior Ranger program which enables children to earn a badge.

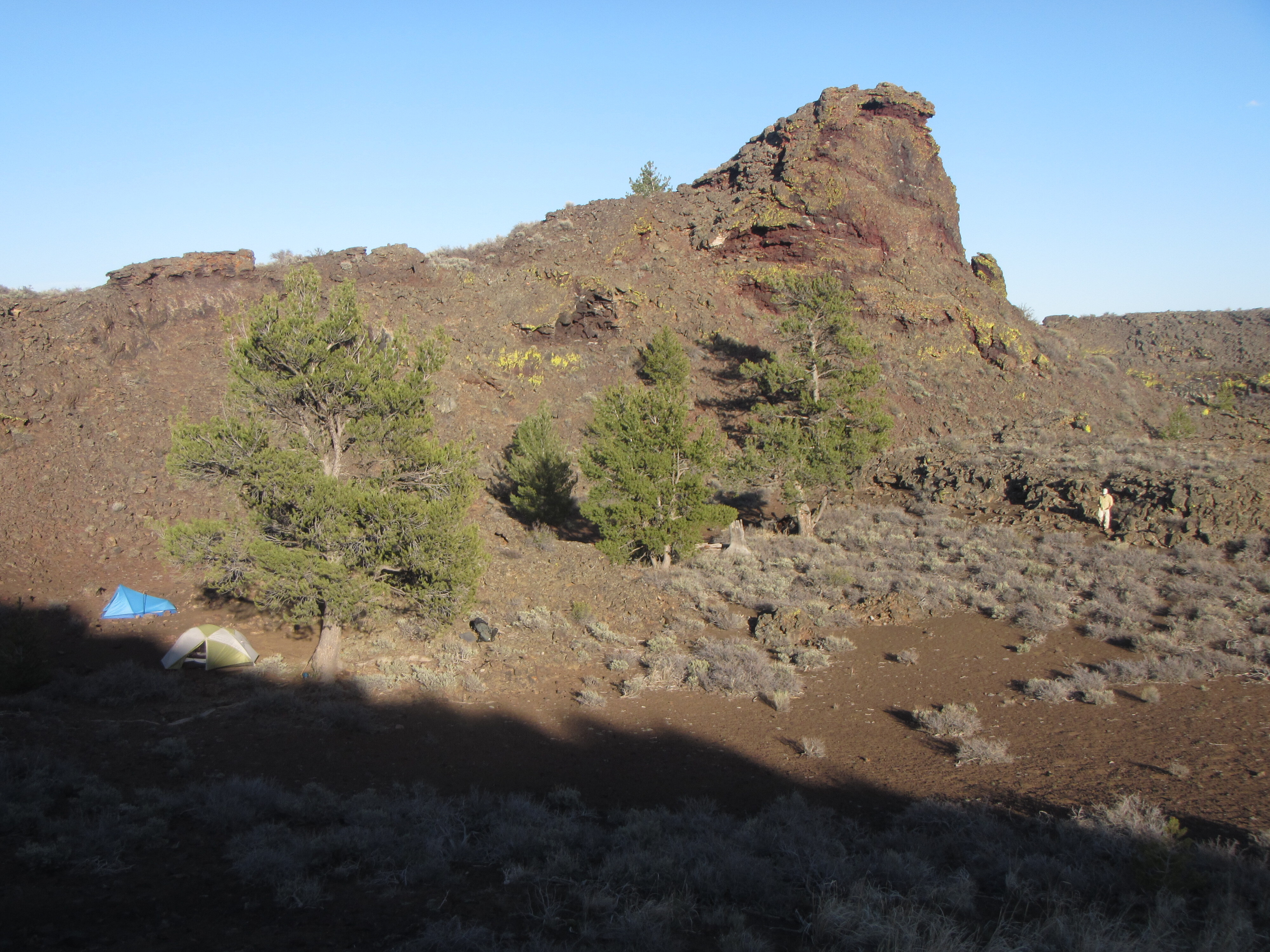
Campers in Echo Crater.

Backcountry hiking is available in the Craters of the Moon Wilderness Area and the much larger backcountry area beyond. Only two trails enter the Wilderness area, the Wilderness Trail and Tree Molds Trail, and even those stop after a few miles. From there, most hikers follow the Great Rift and explore its series of seldom-visited volcanic features. All overnight backcountry hikes require registration at the visitor center. No water is available in the backcountry and the dry climate combined with the high elevation quickly dehydrates hikers. Avoiding summer heat and winter cold are therefore recommended by rangers. Pets, campfires, and all mechanized vehicles, including bicycles, are not allowed in the Wilderness area.

Skiing and snowshoeing are allowed on the Loop Road after it closes to traffic in late November because of snow drifts. Typically, there are 20 inches (51 cm) of snow by January and 25 in (64 cm) by February. Skiing off the Loop Road is allowed in most places but may be dangerous due to sharp lava and hidden holes under the snow. Blizzards and other adverse weather conditions may occur in the winter.

== See also ==
- List of national monuments of the United States
- List of wilderness areas of the United States
- List of volcanoes in the United States
- Dark-sky preserve
- Fissure vent
- Yellowstone hotspot
- Snake River Plain

== Bibliography ==
- Clark, Ella E. (1966). Indian Legends from the Northern Rockies. Norman, OK: University of Oklahoma Press. ISBN 9780806120874.
- Clinton, William Jefferson (November 9, 2000). Boundary Enlargement of the Craters of the Moon National Monument (PDF). Washington, D.C.: Office of the President of the United States. Proclamation 7373. Archived (PDF) from the original on November 12, 2008.
- "Craters of the Moon National Monument and Preserve". www.nps.gov. National Park Service. pp. "Nature", "Campground", "History and Culture", "Management".
- Henderson, Paul (1986). Craters of the Moon: Around the Loop. Craters of the Moon Natural History Association.
- Kiver, Eugene P.; Harris, David V. (1999). Geology of U.S. Parklands (5th ed.). New York: John Wiley & Sons. ISBN 978-0-471-33218-3.
- Louter, David (1992). Craters of the Moon: Administrative history. Seattle, Washington: National Park Service, Pacific Northwest Region. OCLC 54665106.
- National Park Service (1991). Craters of the Moon: National Park Handbook (139). Washington D.C.: National Park Service Division of Publications. ISBN 978-0-912627-44-1.
- Owen, Doug (2004). "Geology of Craters of the Moon". National Park Service. Archived from the original on April 21, 2008.
- United States Geological Survey. "America's Volcanic Past: Craters of the Moon National Monument". United States Geological Survey. Archived from the original on May 17, 2008.
- Western Regional Climate Center (2007). "Craters of the Moon NM, Idaho (102260): Period of Record Monthly Climate Summary". Western Regional Climate Center.
