= Ethmia deconfiturella =

Scientific classification
- Kingdom: Animalia
- Phylum: Arthropoda
- Class: Insecta
- Order: Lepidoptera
- Family: Depressariidae
- Genus: Ethmia
- Species: E. deconfiturella

Binomial name
- Ethmia deconfiturella Viette, 1963

Species of moth

Ethmia deconfiturella is a moth in the Ethmiidae family. It is found in northern Madagascar.

This species has a wingspan of 28–30 mm (1.1–1.2 in). Antennae are dark grey, the forewings are mouse-grey with six black spots By its forewings it remembers Ethmia pylonotella (Viette, 1956) that is smaller in size.

The types provided from the Montagne d'Ambre in northern Madagascar (Diana), 01–06.xii.1958
