= Lava Lake Land & Livestock =

American lamb producer in Idaho

- Company type: Private
- Industry: Food distribution
- Founded: 1999
- Founder: Brian & Kathleen Bean
- Headquarters: Hailey, Idaho
- Key people: Brian and Kathleen Bean, owners and founders Mike Stevens, President
- Products: All-Natural and Certified Organic Lamb
- Website: www.lavalakelamb.com

Lava Lake Land & Livestock is a lamb producer located between the Pioneer Mountains and Craters of the Moon National Monument and Preserve in South Central Idaho. The ranch consists of 24,000 acres (97 km^{2}) of private land and over 900,000 acres (3,600 km^{2}) of lands administered by the Bureau of Land Management (BLM), United States Forest Service, National Park Service, and the Idaho Department of Lands.

== The Ranch ==
Lava Lake Ranch was founded in 1999 with the purchase and consolidation of six historic sheep and cattle ranches. Brian and Kathleen Bean, the new owners, purchased these properties with the intention of producing and marketing certified organic and all-natural lamb while protecting the natural characteristics of the landscape. Their conservation efforts started with the donation of a 7,500-acre (30 km^{2}) conservation easement to the Nature Conservancy. Since that time Lava Lake has created a non-profit organization, the Lava Lake Institute for Science and Conservation to undertake conservation research.

== Lava Lake Lamb ==
All of the lambs raised at Lava Lake are free range and grass-fed throughout their lives. Herders trail the sheep from the Snake River Plain of Southern Idaho north into the Pioneer and Boulder Mountains in Central Idaho, following the seasons.

The lamb produced by Lava Lake has been featured in Sunset Magazine, the San Francisco Chronicle, and the New York Times

Lava Lake Ranch markets their lamb primarily through their website. They are a producer member of Idaho's Bounty, a food cooperative for Central Idaho. Lava Lake Lamb can also be found in a number of restaurants in the northern Rockies.

== Grazing management ==
Lava Lake's grazing method is based on a rigorous scientific analysis of grazing capability and capacity and an assessment of wildlife habitat needs that was conducted in partnership with the Nature Conservancy. Management practices include:

- annual grazing plans
- training and education for sheep herders and staff and bonus system to reward good land stewardship
- GPS collar tracking for sheep bands
- Field inspections of grazing activity
- Ecological monitoring

== Conservation ==
=== Collaboration ===
Lava Lake has collaborated with a number of organizations to accomplish conservation goals in the Pioneers-Craters of the Moon landscape. They are a founding member of the Pioneer's Alliance, a coalition of ranchers, conservationist, scientists, elected and agency officials, recreationsist, and local residents. The goal of this collaboration is the preserving of the landscape where Lava Lake operates.

=== Coexistence with predators ===
Lava Lake has also been influential in developing a strategy for the coexistence with predators. They are a member of the Wood River Wolf Project. In an ongoing effort to avoid conflict with wolves, Lava Lake Ranch, with assistance from Defenders of Wildlife, have equipped herders with radio telemetry receivers, electrified night enclosures, increased night watch, and non-lethal deterrents.

=== Research ===
The Lava Lake Institute has also conducted extensive field research on habitat and migration over the landscape where the ranch's sheep graze. Ongoing research is occurring on the migration patterns of Pronghorn. The research conducted by Lava Lake and collaborating organizations has been incorporated into the Freedom to Roam Campaign being organized by Patagonia.

== Awards ==
Lava Lake has received a number awards for their work on conservation and grazing management. These awards include:

- National Rangeland Stewardship Award, Bureau of Land Management (2009)
- Cecil D. Andrus Leadership Awards for Sustainability and Conservation, Sustainable (2009)
- National Award for Outstanding Achievement in Rangeland Management, US Forest Service (2009)
