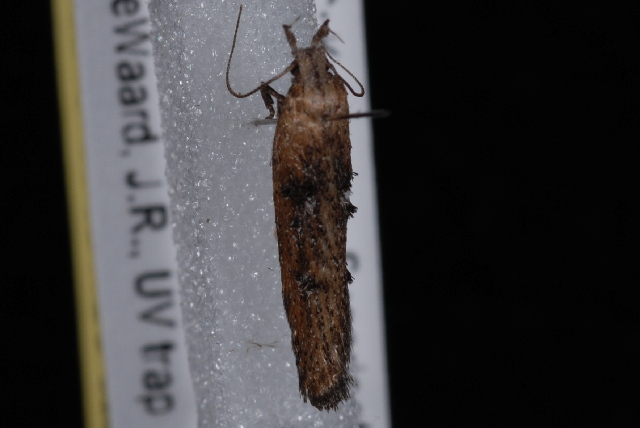

Scientific classification
- Domain: Eukaryota
- Kingdom: Animalia
- Phylum: Arthropoda
- Class: Insecta
- Order: Lepidoptera
- Family: Depressariidae
- Genus: Pyramidobela
- Species: P. quinquecristata

Binomial name
- Pyramidobela quinquecristata (Braun, 1921)

Synonyms
- Enicostoma quinquecristata Braun, 1921

= Pyramidobela quinquecristata =

Species of moth

Pyramidobela quinquecristata is a species of moth in the family Oecophoridae. It is found in the mountains around the margins of the Great Basin in North America.

== Description ==
The length of the forewings is 8.2–9.2 mm (0.32–0.36 in). The ground color of the forewings is dark brown, longitudinally streaked with blackish and ochreous, varying in density and ill-defined except on the veins in the terminal area. The ground color of the hindwings is pale gray-brown, but slightly darker toward the apex. Adults are on wing in June (in British Columbia) and from August to early September (in California).

== Ecology ==
The larvae have been recorded feeding on Penstemon species, including Penstemon confertus and Penstemon deustus.
