= Pseudethmia =

Scientific classification
- Kingdom: Animalia
- Phylum: Arthropoda
- Class: Insecta
- Order: Lepidoptera
- Family: Depressariidae
- Subfamily: Ethmiinae
- Genus: Pseudethmia; Clarke, 1950
- Species: P. protuberans

Binomial name
- Pseudethmia protuberans Clarke, 1950

Genus of moths

Pseudethmia is a genus of moths in the family Depressariidae. It contains only one species, Pseudethmia protuberans, which is endemic to lower elevation deserts of south-eastern California and probably north-eastern Baja California.
