= Pyramidobela tetraphyta =

Scientific classification
- Kingdom: Animalia
- Phylum: Arthropoda
- Class: Insecta
- Order: Lepidoptera
- Family: Depressariidae
- Genus: Pyramidobela
- Species: P. tetraphyta

Binomial name
- Pyramidobela tetraphyta Meyrick, 1931

Species of moth

Pyramidobela tetraphyta is a moth in the family Oecophoridae. It is found in Mexico.

The length of the forewings is 9.4–10.3 mm (0.37–0.41 in). The ground color of the forewings is pale tan, more or less evenly dusted with brownish, at times tending to form longitudinal streaks on the costa and in the apical area. The ground color of the hindwings is pale gray. Adults are on wing in April and from September to November.
