= Agrioceros subnota =

Scientific classification
- Domain: Eukaryota
- Kingdom: Animalia
- Phylum: Arthropoda
- Class: Insecta
- Order: Lepidoptera
- Family: Depressariidae
- Genus: Agrioceros
- Species: A. subnota

Binomial name
- Agrioceros subnota Diakonoff, 1966

Species of moth

Agrioceros subnota is a moth in the family Depressariidae. It was described by Alexey Diakonoff in 1966. It is found on Java.
