= Erysiptila =

Scientific classification
- Kingdom: Animalia
- Phylum: Arthropoda
- Class: Insecta
- Order: Lepidoptera
- Family: Depressariidae
- Subfamily: Ethmiinae
- Genus: Erysiptila; Meyrick, 1914
- Species: E. clevelandi

Binomial name
- Erysiptila clevelandi (Busck, 1914)

Synonyms
- Cyrictodes Meyrick, 1926; Borkhausenia clevelandi Busck, 1914; Cyrictodes phormophora Meyrick, 1926

Genus of moths

Erysiptila is a genus of moths in the family Depressariidae. It contains only one species, Erysiptila clevelandi, which is found in Panama and Costa Rica.

The wingspan is about 18 mm. The forewings are white, irregularly mottled with grey and with a suffused blackish-fuscous triangular patch extending on the costa from near the base to three-fifths, and reaching half across wing. There are two tufts of scales beneath this on the end of the cell and a few scattered black scales towards the dorsum in the middle. There is also a black dot in the disc towards the apex, and a smaller one on the termen beneath it. The hindwings are grey, suffused darker posteriorly.
