= Pyramidobela ochrolepra =

Scientific classification
- Kingdom: Animalia
- Phylum: Arthropoda
- Clade: Pancrustacea
- Class: Insecta
- Order: Lepidoptera
- Family: Depressariidae
- Genus: Pyramidobela
- Species: P. ochrolepra

Binomial name
- Pyramidobela ochrolepra Powell, 1973

Species of moth

Pyramidobela ochrolepra is a moth in the family Oecophoridae. It is found in Mexico.

The length of the forewings is about 7.2 mm (0.28 in). The ground color of the forewings is brownish white. The costal and dorsal areas are faintly suffused with darker brown, leaving an ill-defined, whitish clouding longitudinally through the middle of the wing. The ground color of the hindwings is pale gray.
