= Pyramidobela angelarum =

Scientific classification
- Domain: Eukaryota
- Kingdom: Animalia
- Phylum: Arthropoda
- Class: Insecta
- Order: Lepidoptera
- Family: Depressariidae
- Genus: Pyramidobela
- Species: P. angelarum

Binomial name
- Pyramidobela angelarum Keifer, 1936

Species of moth

Pyramidobela angelarum, The buddleia budworm moth, is a moth in the family Oecophoridae. It is known only from urban situations near the coast of California in the United States, but is most likely is introduced there, since the only known food plant is the ornamental Buddleia, which is a primarily tropical genus.

The length of the forewings is 7.8–9.5 mm (0.31–0.37 in). The ground color of the forewings is gray-brown, lightly speckled with brown. The ground color of the hindwings is pale gray. Adults are on wing from late February to early December.

The larvae have been recorded feeding on Buddleia species. They roll and skeletonize the leaves of their host plant and bore into the terminal buds.
