= Betroka (moth) =

Scientific classification
- Kingdom: Animalia
- Phylum: Arthropoda
- Class: Insecta
- Order: Lepidoptera
- Family: Depressariidae
- Subfamily: Ethmiinae
- Genus: Betroka; Viette, 1955
- Species: B. jacobsella

Binomial name
- Betroka jacobsella Viette, 1955

Genus of moths

Betroka is a genus of insects in the family Depressariidae from Madagascar. There is only one species in this genus: Betroka jacobsella Viette, 1955.

== Publication ==
- Viette, P. 1955a. Nouveaux Tineoidea (s.l.) de Madagascar (Lep.). - Annales de la Société Entomologique de France 123(1954):75–114.
