= Agrioceros hypomelas =

Scientific classification
- Domain: Eukaryota
- Kingdom: Animalia
- Phylum: Arthropoda
- Class: Insecta
- Order: Lepidoptera
- Family: Depressariidae
- Genus: Agrioceros
- Species: A. hypomelas

Binomial name
- Agrioceros hypomelas (Diakonoff, 1966)

Synonyms
- Chrysethmia hypomelas Diakonoff, 1966

Species of moth

Agrioceros hypomelas is a moth in the family Depressariidae. It was described by Alexey Diakonoff in 1966. It is found on Sulawesi.
