= Pyramidobela agyrtodes =

Scientific classification
- Kingdom: Animalia
- Phylum: Arthropoda
- Class: Insecta
- Order: Lepidoptera
- Family: Depressariidae
- Genus: Pyramidobela
- Species: P. agyrtodes

Binomial name
- Pyramidobela agyrtodes (Meyrick, 1927)

Synonyms
- Idioptila agyrtodes Meyrick, 1927

Species of moth

Pyramidobela agyrtodes is a moth in the family Oecophoridae. It is found from in southern North America from extreme western Texas to southern Chihuahua and Nuevo León.

The length of the forewings is 7.4–9.3 mm (0.29–0.37 in). The ground color of the forewings is pale gray, lightly speckled with pale brownish, although the costal half is scattered with ocherous. The ground color of the hindwings is whitish, basally becoming gray-brown toward the apex. Adults are on wing from April to May (in Texas), July (southern Chihuahua) to September (northern Chihuahua).
