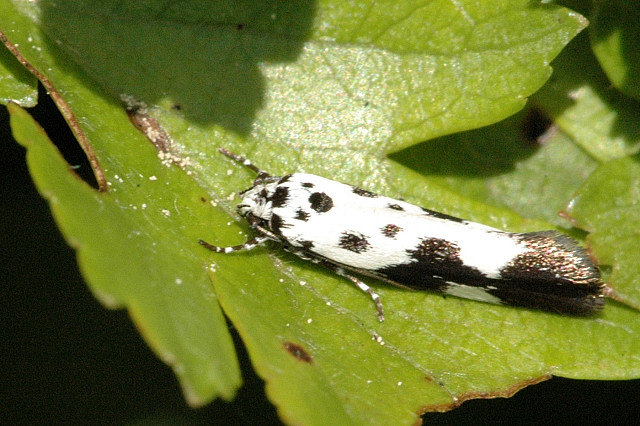
- Dorsal view
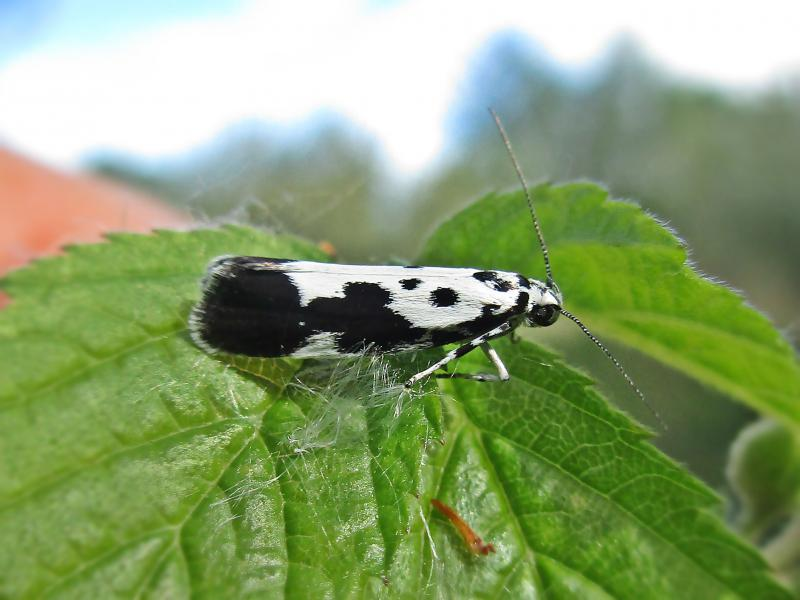
- Side view

Scientific classification
- Kingdom: Animalia
- Phylum: Arthropoda
- Clade: Pancrustacea
- Class: Insecta
- Order: Lepidoptera
- Family: Depressariidae
- Genus: Ethmia
- Species: E. quadrillella

Binomial name
- Ethmia quadrillella (Goeze, 1783)

Synonyms
- List: Erminea funerea (lapsus); Ethmia afflatella (Fuchs, 1903); Ethmia canuisella (Millière, 1867); Ethmia disjuncta (Dufrane, 1942); Ethmia funerella (Fabricius, 1787); Ethmia luctuosella (Herrich-Schäffer, [1854]); Psecadia canusiella (lapsus); Psecadia funerella var. afflatella Fuchs, 1903; Psecadia funerella var. canuisella Millière, 1867; Psecadia funerella ab. disjuncta Dufrane, 1942; Psecadia luctuosella Herrich-Schäffer, [1854]; Tinea funerella Fabricius, 1787; Tinea inversella Fourcroy, 1785

= Ethmia quadrillella =

Species of moth

Ethmia quadrillella is a moth belonging to the family Depressariidae, subfamily Ethmiinae.

== Subspecies ==
Three subspecies have been described:

- Ethmia quadrillella quadrillela – northern populations
- Ethmia quadrillella canuisella (Millière, 1867) – southwestern populations (southern France, Italy)
- Ethmia quadrillella luctuosella (Herrich-Schäffer, 1854) – Asia Minor

== Distribution ==
This species can be found in Eurasia.

== Habitat ==
This species mainly inhabits unmanaged meadows, hedge rows and rough grasslands.

== Description ==
The wingspan of the moth ranges from 15–19 mm (0.59–0.75 in). The basic color of wings is white, with large black markings.

== Biology ==
The flight time ranges from May to mid September in one or two generations. The host plants are comfrey (genus Symphytum), forget-me-not (genus Myosotis) and lungwort (Pulmonaria officinalis). Larvae overwinter in a cocoon amongst leaf litter.

== Gallery ==
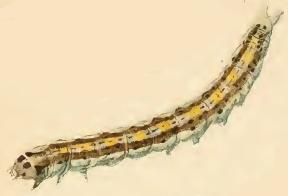
Larva

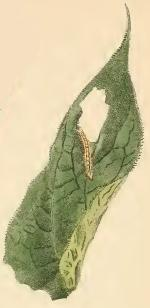
A piece of Symphytum officinale leaf eaten by larva

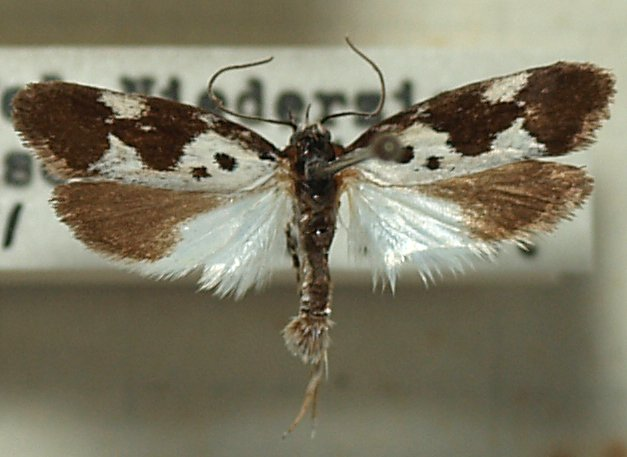
Mounted specimen
