= Agrioceros platycypha =

Scientific classification
- Kingdom: Animalia
- Phylum: Arthropoda
- Class: Insecta
- Order: Lepidoptera
- Family: Depressariidae
- Genus: Agrioceros
- Species: A. platycypha

Binomial name
- Agrioceros platycypha Meyrick, 1928

Species of moth

Agrioceros platycypha is a moth in the family Depressariidae. It was described by Edward Meyrick in 1928. It is found in the Philippines.

The wingspan is about 35 mm. The forewings are orange yellow with seven dark purple-fuscous dots: two in the cell at one-fourth and the middle of the wing, two transversely placed beyond the cell, two obliquely placed towards the apex and one on the tornus. The hindwings are light yellow.
