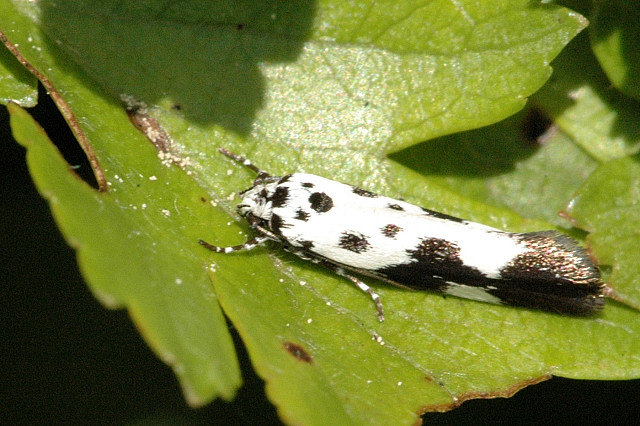
- Adult Ethmia quadrillella at Commanster (Belgian Ardennes)

Scientific classification
- Kingdom: Animalia
- Phylum: Arthropoda
- Clade: Pancrustacea
- Class: Insecta
- Order: Lepidoptera
- Family: Depressariidae
- Subfamily: Ethmiinae; Busck, 1909

Synonyms
- Azinidae Walsingham, 1906; Ethmiadae Meyrick, 1909; Ethmiinae Brues, Melander & Carpenter, 1954 (but see text)

= Ethmiinae =

Subfamily of moths

The Ethmiinae are a subfamily of small moths in the superfamily Gelechioidea sometimes included in the Elachistidae or the Oecophoridae, but mostly in the Depressariidae as a subfamily Ethmiinae.

== Genera ==
Seven genera are presently placed here; numerous others are now considered junior synonyms (mostly of Ethmia):

- Agrioceros
- Betroka
- Erysiptila
- Ethmia
- Macrocirca
- Pseudethmia
- Pyramidobela (sometimes placed in the Oecophoridae (or Oecophorinae, if the Ethmiidae are included in Oecophoridae as subfamily).
- Sphecodora
