= Pyramidobela epibryas =

Scientific classification
- Kingdom: Animalia
- Phylum: Arthropoda
- Class: Insecta
- Order: Lepidoptera
- Family: Depressariidae
- Genus: Pyramidobela
- Species: P. epibryas

Binomial name
- Pyramidobela epibryas Meyrick, 1931

Species of moth

Pyramidobela epibryas is a moth in the family Oecophoridae. It is found in São Paulo, Brazil.

The length of the forewings is about 7.5 mm (0.30 in). The ground color of the forewings is dark brown. The basal fourth is suffused with whitish. There are some scattered black scales and two or three small blackish spots near the base. The ground color of the hindwings is gray, but light anteriorly. Adults have been recorded in October.
