= Pyramidobela compulsa =

Scientific classification
- Kingdom: Animalia
- Phylum: Arthropoda
- Class: Insecta
- Order: Lepidoptera
- Family: Depressariidae
- Genus: Pyramidobela
- Species: P. compulsa

Binomial name
- Pyramidobela compulsa Meyrick, 1931

Species of moth

Pyramidobela compulsa is a moth in the family Oecophoridae. It is found in southern Chile.

The length of the forewings is about 9.5 mm (0.37 in). The ground color of the forewings is whitish ocherous irregularly suffused with brownish. The ground color of the hindwings is gray-whitish. Adults have been recorded in December.
