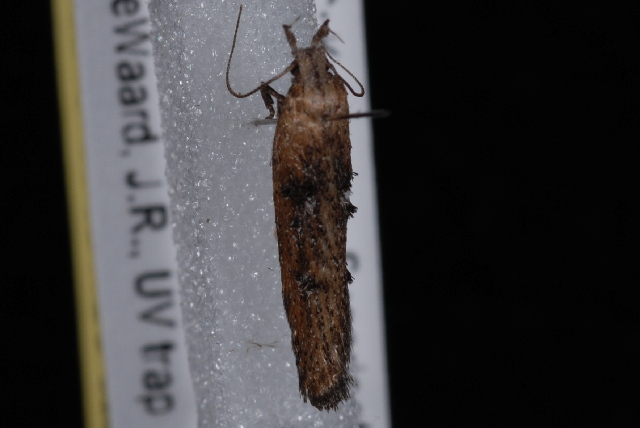
- Pyramidobela quinquecristata

Scientific classification
- Domain: Eukaryota
- Kingdom: Animalia
- Phylum: Arthropoda
- Class: Insecta
- Order: Lepidoptera
- Family: Depressariidae
- Subfamily: Ethmiinae
- Genus: Pyramidobela; Braun, 1923

Synonyms
- Idioptila Meyrick, 1927

= Pyramidobela =

Genus of insects

Pyramidobela is a genus of insects which is mostly placed in the family Oecophoridae. The genus was formerly included in the Ethmiidae.

== Species ==
- Pyramidobela agyrtodes (Meyrick, 1927)
- Pyramidobela angelarum (Keifer, 1936)
- Pyramidobela compulsa (Meyrick, 1931)
- Pyramidobela epibryas (Meyrick, 1931)
- Pyramidobela ochrolepra (Powell, 1973)
- Pyramidobela quinquecristata (Braun, 1921)
- Pyramidobela tetraphyta (Meyrick, 1931)
