= Lava Lake Institute for Science and Conservation =

American nonprofit organization in Idaho

- Company type: Not-for-profit Organization
- Industry: Not-for-profit Conservation
- Founded: 2004
- Founder: Brian & Kathleen Bean
- Headquarters: Hailey, Idaho
- Area served: Central Idaho
- Key people: Brian and Kathleen Bean, founders Tess O'Sullivan, Program Director of Science and Conservation
- Website: lavalakeinstitute.org

The Lava Lake Institute for Science and Conservation is a not-for-profit organization with a mission to increase scientific knowledge and advance conservation in the Pioneer Mountains (Idaho) and Craters of the Moon National Monument region of south-central Idaho. The institute is engaged in research and conservation projects.

== Founding ==
The institute was established in 2004 by Brian and Kathleen Bean, owners of Lava Lake Ranch who had conducted research and habitat restoration projects on their own deeded and leased public lands. As their own conservation programs increased in size and scope, they recognized the need for an independent non-profit that would promote and conduct scientific research and implement more ambitious conservation projects throughout the region.

== Projects ==
The major project areas of the Lava Lake Institute include land conservation, scientific research, education, and collaboration with partners. Examples of the institute's work include:

- Initiated study of pronghorn migration in the Pioneer Mountains - Craters of the Moon landscape with multiple partners.
- In partnership with BLM and other entities, initiated and supported ecological inventories and experimental research conducted by independent scientists.
- Established Lava Lake Research Fund to formalize commitment to supporting scientific research.
- Conducted a workshop and lecture program with ethno-botanist Gary Paul Nabhan for local community leaders, ranchers and educators to address conservation issues related to local food production.
- Conducted outreach and education efforts to inform students, scientists, and natural resource management professionals about our work.
- Developed relationships and partnerships with non-profit organizations dedicated to conservation (The Nature Conservancy, Wood River Land Trust, Idaho Conservation League, The Conservation Fund, Sawtooth Science Institute), professional scientists (University of Idaho, Idaho State University, New Mexico State University, Princeton University, Brigham Young University- Idaho), and land managers (Bureau of Land Management, United States Forest Service, Idaho Department of Fish and Game, National Park Service).
- Developed GIS database to house and make use of ecological data generated through inventory efforts and scientific research.
