= Agrioceros magnificella =

Scientific classification
- Domain: Eukaryota
- Kingdom: Animalia
- Phylum: Arthropoda
- Class: Insecta
- Order: Lepidoptera
- Family: Depressariidae
- Genus: Agrioceros
- Species: A. magnificella

Binomial name
- Agrioceros magnificella (Sauber, 1902)

Synonyms
- Psecadia magnificella Sauber, 1902

Species of moth

Agrioceros magnificella is a moth in the family Depressariidae. It was described by Sauber in 1902. It is found in the Philippines.

The length of the forewings is 12–13 mm for males and about 15 mm for females. The forewings are yellow with eleven black dots. The hindwings are uniform dull yellow.
