= Agrioceros =

Scientific classification
- Domain: Eukaryota
- Kingdom: Animalia
- Phylum: Arthropoda
- Class: Insecta
- Order: Lepidoptera
- Family: Depressariidae
- Subfamily: Ethmiinae
- Genus: Agrioceros; Meyrick, 1928

Synonyms
- Chrysethmia A.N. Diakonoff, 1966 (junior subjective synonym)

Genus of moths

Agrioceros is a genus of moths in the family Depressariidae.

== Species ==
- Agrioceros hypomelas Diakonoff, 1966
- Agrioceros magnificella Sauber, 1902
- Agrioceros neogena Diakonoff, 1966
- Agrioceros platycypha Meyrick, 1928
- Agrioceros subnota Diakonoff, 1966
- Agrioceros zelaea Meyrick, 1906
