= Sphecodora =

Scientific classification
- Kingdom: Animalia
- Phylum: Arthropoda
- Class: Insecta
- Order: Lepidoptera
- Family: Depressariidae
- Subfamily: Ethmiinae
- Genus: Sphecodora; Meyrick in Alluaud & Jeannel, 1920
- Species: S. porphyrias

Binomial name
- Sphecodora porphyrias Meyrick, 1920

Genus of moths

Sphecodora is a genus of moths in the family Depressariidae. It contains only one species, Sphecodora porphyrias, which is found in Kenya.
