= Agrioceros zelaea =

Scientific classification
- Kingdom: Animalia
- Phylum: Arthropoda
- Class: Insecta
- Order: Lepidoptera
- Family: Depressariidae
- Genus: Agrioceros
- Species: A. zelaea

Binomial name
- Agrioceros zelaea (Meyrick, 1906)

Synonyms
- Ethmia zelaea Meyrick, 1906

Species of moth

Agrioceros zelaea is a moth in the family Depressariidae. It was described by Edward Meyrick in 1906. It is found in Sri Lanka.

The wingspan is about 30 mm (1.2 in). The forewings are deep ochreous yellow with thirteen black dots: one in the middle of the base, two small ones beneath the costa near the base, one in the disc at one-sixths, one beneath the costa beyond one-fourth, one beneath the fold at two-fifths, one in the disc above the middle, five in a posterior group in the disc and one on the tornus. There is a twice interrupted black streak along the upper half of the termen. The hindwings are pale ochreous yellow.
