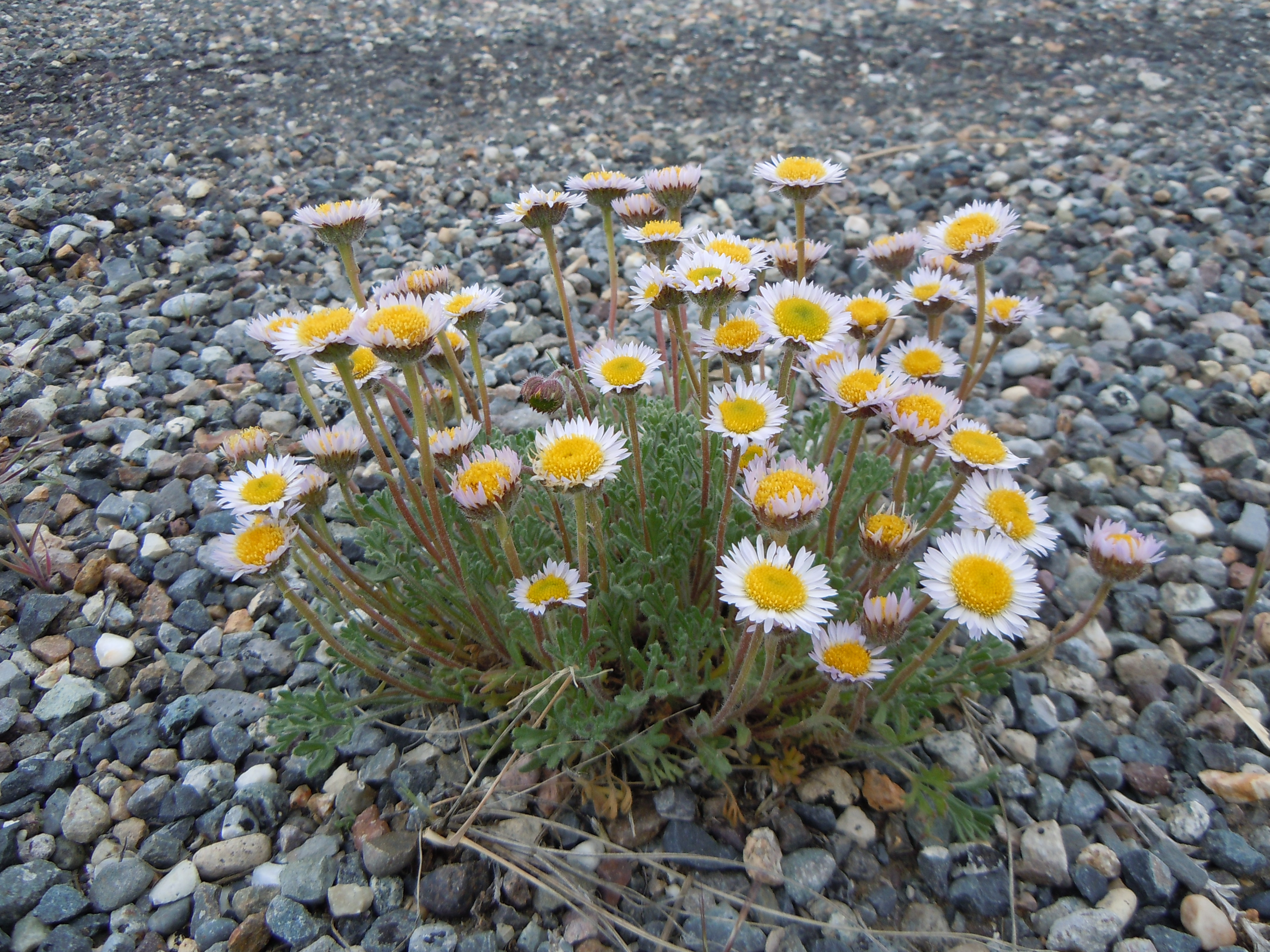

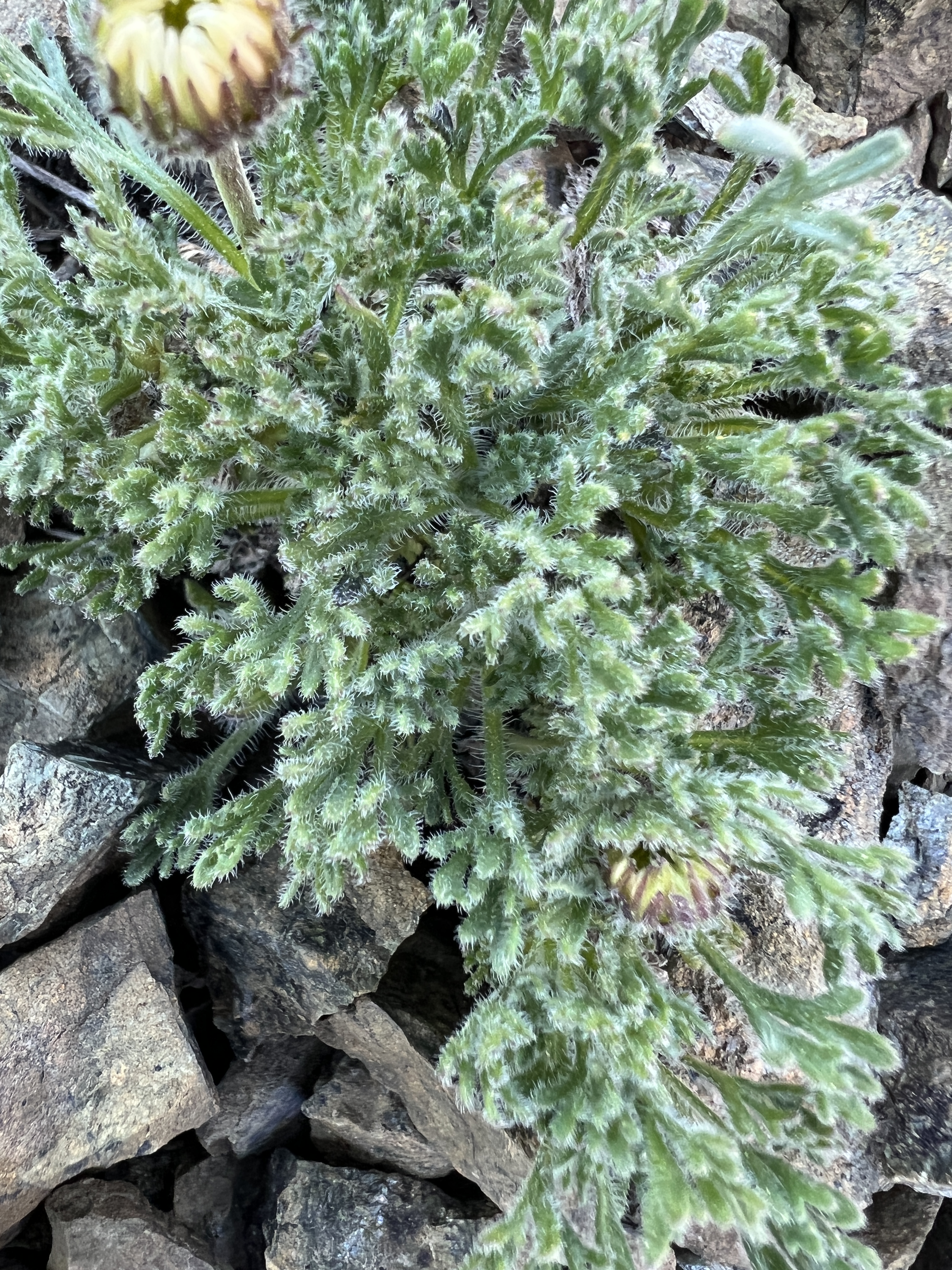
- Leaves

Conservation status
- Secure (NatureServe)

Scientific classification
- Kingdom: Plantae
- Clade: Tracheophytes
- Clade: Angiosperms
- Clade: Eudicots
- Clade: Asterids
- Order: Asterales
- Family: Asteraceae
- Genus: Erigeron
- Species: E. compositus

Binomial name
- Erigeron compositus Pursh

Synonyms
- Erigeron compositum Pursh; Cineraria lewisii Richardson; Erigeron gormanii Greene; Erigeron multifidus Rydb.; Erigeron pedatus Nutt.

= Erigeron compositus =

Species of fleabane

Erigeron compositus is an Arctic and alpine species of fleabane in the family Asteraceae. Common names include dwarf mountain fleabane, cutleaf daisy, and trifid mountain fleabane.

== Range ==
Erigeron compositus has been found in the Russian Far East (Wrangel Island and Chukotka), Alaska, Greenland, much of Canada (all three Arctic territories plus British Columbia, all three Prairie Provinces, Quebec, Newfoundland, and Nova Scotia), and the Western United States (from the Pacific Coast as far east as the Dakotas, Colorado, and New Mexico).

== Description ==
Erigeron compositus is a perennial herb rarely more than 25 cm (10 in) tall, with a thick growth of basal leaves, the tips of which are divided. The plant produces a taproot and spreads by means of horizontal underground rhizomes. The leaves are often densely hairy but can range to fully glabrous. There is generally only one flower head per stem, each head with 20–60 white, pink or blue ray florets; these are sometimes small and easily mistaken for disc florets. Genuine disc florets are yellow and in the center of the head. The flower stem and bract is covered with hairs, often glandular.

== Habitat ==
Erigeron compositus grows in rocky areas in mountains up to 3,000 meters in elevation. They can grow in any ordinary garden soil, preferably with good drainage.
