= Ella E. Clark =

American writer

Ella Elizabeth Clark (January 8, 1896 – July 9, 1984) was an American educator, writer, and Professor Emerita of English. Although Clark was not a trained anthropologist or folklorist, she collected large numbers of American Indian and First Nations oral traditions and made them available to a wide readership.

== Early life and education ==
Ella Elizabeth Clark was born in Summertown, Tennessee on January 8, 1896. She is the daughter of Samuel L. and Linda (Shaw) Clark and attended high school in Peoria, Illinois before she started working as a high school teacher for English and dramatics. In 1921 she received her B.A. from Northwestern University and her M.A. in 1927. In the same year she started teaching at the English Department at Washington State University in Pullman, Washington.

== Career ==
Her early academic interest was on writing, national forests, and descriptions of the local landscape. During World War II she worked as a fire lookout for the United States Forest Service in the Cascade Range.

In the years after her work as a lookout she went on research trips through North America, interviewed indigenous people, and collected their oral traditions. She published the results of her research in her books Indian Legends of the Pacific Northwest (1953), Indian Legends of Canada (1960), and Indian Legends from the Northern Rockies (1966). In 1966 she received the Governor's Writers Day Award.

Clark devoted a great part of her life to the study of oral traditions of the indigenous people of North America. She recovered many of these traditions from research of library documents such as early anthropological studies, manuscripts of pioneers, but also by talking to members of the Native tribes herself.

Many of the stories collected by Clark deal with landscape features of specific regions of North America. These and other stories contain indigenous knowledge about landmarks as, for example, Crater Lake and cataclysmic events such as earthquakes and floods, and have been used to gain additional insights into the geological past.

Clark retired as English lecturer in 1961. Her health deteriorated and she moved to La Jolla, California. Clark finished her last project, Sacagawea of the Lewis and Clark Expedition (1983) with the help of Margot Edmonds. After she had suffered a stroke, she was sent to a nursing home. Clark died in California at the age of 88 on July 9, 1984.

== Critical reception ==
Clark wrote her books for a general readership, teachers, and students. For this purpose she frequently edited the original texts, which was criticized by some anthropologists and folklorists Other scholars such as Canadian anthropologist Marius Barbeau acknowledged Clark's work and effort "considering that she is not a professional folklorist."

The stories collected by Clark have been cited in various handbooks and anthologies of indigenous American oral traditions.

== Works ==
- Clark, Ella E. (1953). Indian legends of the Pacific Northwest. Berkeley: University of California Press.
- Clark, Ella E. (1960). Indian Legends of Canada. Toronto: McClelland and Stewart Inc.
- Clark, Ella E. (1966). Indian Legends from the Northern Rockies. Norman, Oklahoma: University of Oklahoma Press.
- Clark, Ella E., and Margot Edmonds. (1983). Sacagawea of the Lewis and Clark Expedition. Berkeley and Los Angeles: University of California Press.

== Sources ==
- Cage 146, Ella Elizabeth Clark Papers. Manuscripts, Archives, and Special Collections, Washington State University Libraries, Pullman, WA.
- Wright, Frances Valentine, ed. Who’s Who Among Pacific Northwest Authors. (1969). 2nd ed. Pacific Northwest Library Association.
- Who's Who of American Women. 1972-1973. 7th. ed. (1971). Chicago: Marquis Who's Who, Inc.
