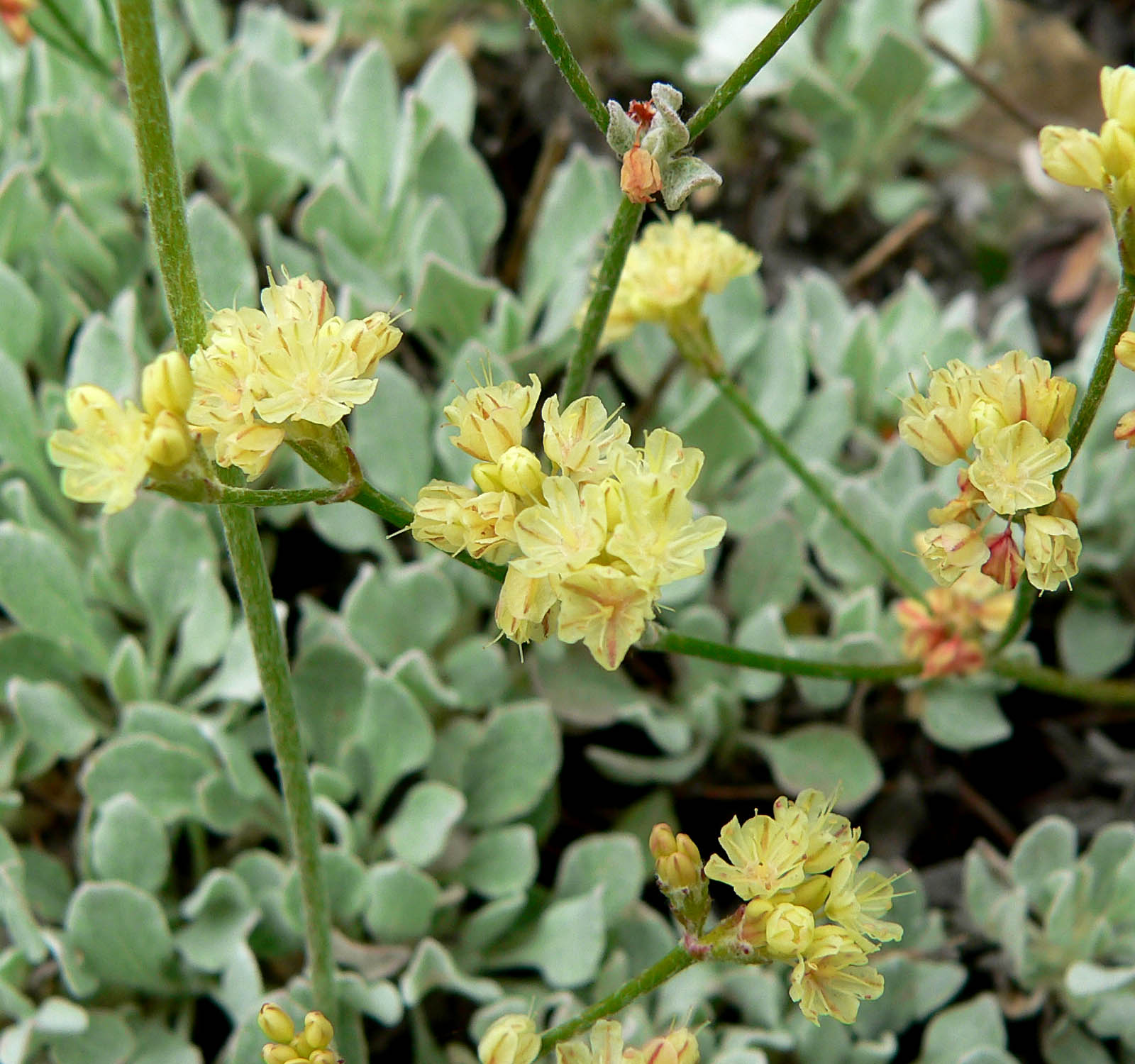
- var. ovalifolium

Conservation status
- Secure (NatureServe)

Scientific classification
- Kingdom: Plantae
- Clade: Tracheophytes
- Clade: Angiosperms
- Clade: Eudicots
- Order: Caryophyllales
- Family: Polygonaceae
- Genus: Eriogonum
- Species: E. ovalifolium

Binomial name
- Eriogonum ovalifolium Nutt.

Synonyms
- List: Eriogonum davisianum S.Stokes; Eriogonum depressum (Blank.) Rydb.; Eriogonum dichroanthum Gand.; Eriogonum elongatum Nutt. ex Benth.; Eriogonum eximium Tidestr.; Eriogonum nivale Canby ex Coville; Eriogonum nuttallii Gambel ex Nutt.; Eriogonum ochroleucum Small ex Rydb.; Eriogonum ochroleucum var. decalvans Gand.; Eriogonum ochroleucum var. macropodum Gand.; Eriogonum orthocaulon Small; Eriogonum ovalifolium var. celsum A.Nelson; Eriogonum ovalifolium var. cerastoides Gand.; Eriogonum ovalifolium var. cyclophyllum Gand.; Eriogonum ovalifolium var. deltoideum Gand.; Eriogonum ovalifolium subsp. eximium (Tidestr.) S.Stokes; Eriogonum ovalifolium var. macropodum (Gand.) Reveal; Eriogonum ovalifolium var. multiscapum Gand.; Eriogonum ovalifolium var. nevadense Gand.; Eriogonum ovalifolium subsp. ochroleucum (Small ex Rydb.) S.Stokes; Eriogonum ovalifolium var. orthocaulon (Small) C.L.Hitchc.; Eriogonum ovalifolium subsp. purpureum (Nutt.) S.Stokes; Eriogonum ovalifolium subsp. typicum S.Stokes; Eriogonum ovalifolium var. typicum Gand.; Eriogonum ovalifolium var. utahense Gand.; Eriogonum ovalifolium subsp. vineum (Small) S.Stokes; Eriogonum polyceps Nutt. ex Torr. & A.Gray; Eriogonum purpureum (Nutt.) Nutt. ex Benth.; Eriogonum purpureum var. tenuius Benth.; Eriogonum rhodanthum A.Nelson & P.B.Kenn.; Eriogonum roseiflorum Gand.; Eriogonum rubidum Gand.; Eriogonum tenellum Nutt.; Eriogonum vineum Small; Eucycla ovalifolia (Nutt.) Nutt.; Eucycla purpurea Nutt.

= Eriogonum ovalifolium =

Species of wild buckwheat

Eriogonum ovalifolium is a species of wild buckwheat known by the common name cushion buckwheat. It is native to western North America from California to Alberta, where it is a member of many plant communities in varied habitats, including the sagebrush steppe and alpine regions.

== Description ==
In general, the species is a tough perennial herb which forms mats in gravelly soil or amongst rocks and produces erect inflorescences up to 35 centimeters (14 in) in height, blooming from early to mid-summer. The flowering stems are leafless. The pale green to gray leaves at the base of the plant are rounded and woolly and have petioles.

The clumps of flowers are yellow, light red or pink, purple, or white.

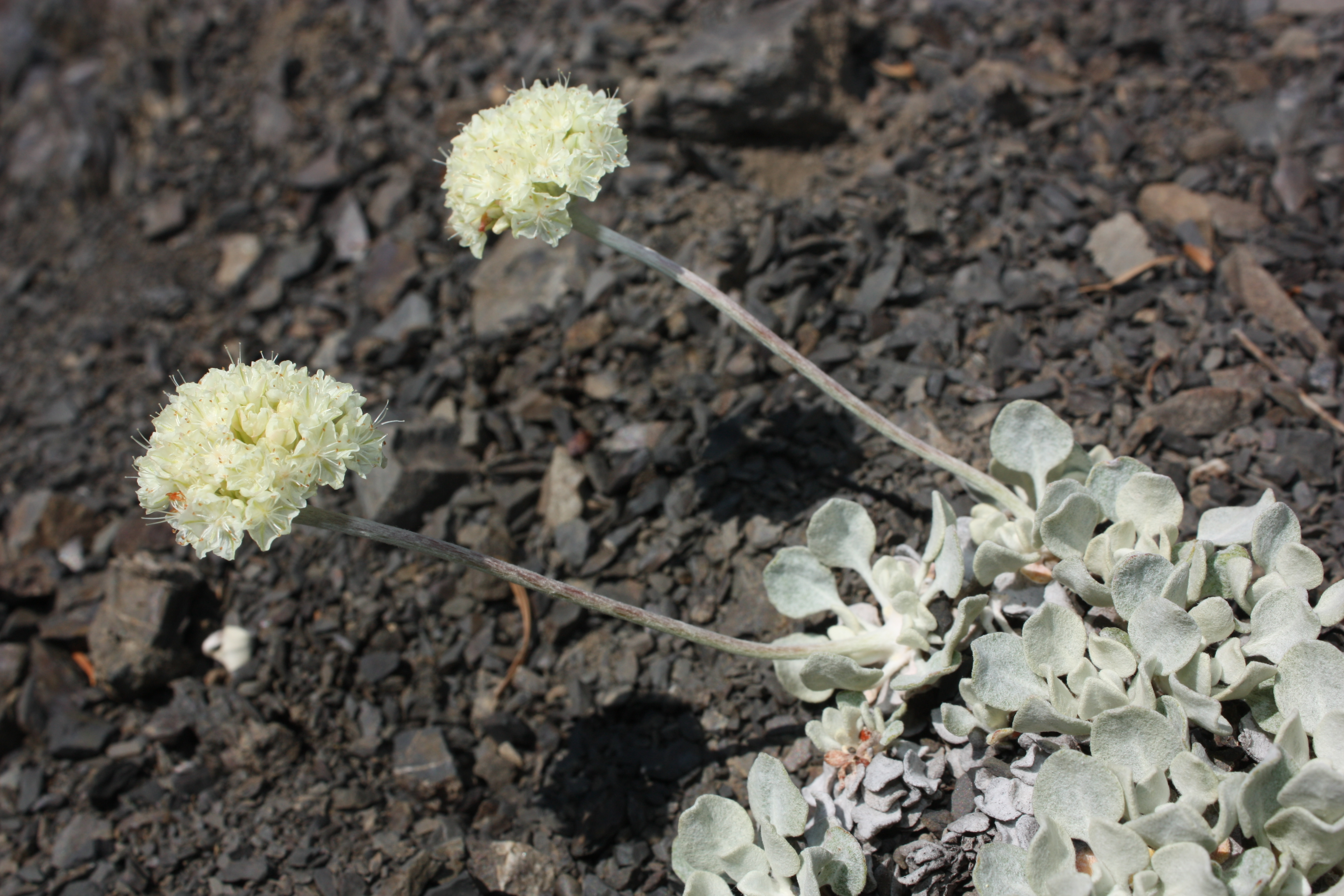
Variety nivale is found at subalpine and alpine elevations west of the Rocky Mountain crest. The leaves are densely covered with white wooly matted hair.

== Taxonomy ==
Eriogonum ovalifolium was named in 1834 by Thomas Nuttall, placing it in the Eriogonum genus. Along with its genus it is classified as part of the Polygonaceae family.

=== Varieties ===
There are four to thirteen varieties of this species.

- Eriogonum ovalifolium var. caelestinum, native to California and Nevada. It was described in 1972 by James L. Reveal.
- Eriogonum ovalifolium var. depressum, native to Alberta, Idaho, Montana, Nevada, Oregon, and Wyoming. It was described in 1905 by Joseph William Blankinship.
- Eriogonum ovalifolium var. eximium, native to eastern California and western Nevada. The variety was originally described as a species by Ivar Tidestrom in 1923 and classified as a variety in 1975 by John Thomas Howell.
- Eriogonum ovalifolium var. focarium, endemic to Idaho. It was described by Reveal and Donald Holmes Mansfield in 2014.
- Eriogonum ovalifolium var. monarchense, endemic to just Fresno County, California. It was described by Dana Adrian York in 2002.
- Eriogonum ovalifolium var. nivale, it is native to British Columbia, Washington, Oregon, California, Nevada, and Utah. It was described as a species by Frederick Vernon Coville in 1893 and reduced to a variety by Marcus E. Jones in 1903.
- Eriogonum ovalifolium var. ochroleucum, is native to just Montana and Wyoming. It was also described as a species in 1900 by Per Axel Rydberg, but attributed to John Kunkel Small. It was reduced to a variety in 1941 by Morton Peck.
- Eriogonum ovalifolium var. ovalifolium, this variety is the autonym for the species and it grows in the western US from Colorado and Montana westward to the Pacific states.
- Eriogonum ovalifolium var. pansum, is native to just Idaho and Montana. It was described by Reveal in 1989.
- Eriogonum ovalifolium var. purpureum, grows throughout the western United States and into Alberta and British Columbia. It was described by Thomas Nuttall as a species in 1848 and reduced to a variety in 1860 by Elias Durand.
- Eriogonum ovalifolium var. rubidum, is endemic to the state of Oregon. It was described as a species in 1906 by Michel Gandoger and reclassified as a variety in 2014 by Reveal and Mansfield.
- Eriogonum ovalifolium var. vineum, the Cushenbury buckwheat, is endemic to the San Bernardino Mountains of San Bernardino County, California. It is federally listed as an endangered species of the United States, and the main threat to its existence is mining. It was described by John Kunkel Small in 1898 as a species and changed to a variety by Aven Nelson in 1911.
- Eriogonum ovalifolium var. williamsiae, the steamboat buckwheat, is known only from the Steamboat Hills near Reno, Nevada. It is a federally listed endangered species and is listed as critically endangered and fully protected by the State of Nevada. Threats to it have been reduced but the populations are still quite small. It was scientifically described by James L. Reveal in 1981.

Eriogonum ovalifolium has a total of 36 synonyms due to changes in classification to its many varieties. Of these 18 are species names.

Table of Synonyms
Name	Year	Synonym of:	Notes
Eriogonum davisianum S.Stokes	1943	var. purpureum	= het.
Eriogonum depressum (Blank.) Rydb.	1912	var. depressum	≡ hom.
Eriogonum dichroanthum Gand.	1906	var. purpureum	= het.
Eriogonum elongatum Nutt. ex Benth.	1856	var. ovalifolium	= het.
Eriogonum eximium Tidestr.	1923	var. eximium	≡ hom.
Eriogonum nivale Canby ex Coville	1893	var. nivale	≡ hom.
Eriogonum nuttallii Gambel ex Nutt.	1848	var. purpureum	= het.
Eriogonum ochroleucum Small ex Rydb.	1900	var. ochroleucum	≡ hom.
Eriogonum orthocaulon Small	1906	var. purpureum	= het.
Eriogonum polyceps Nutt. ex Torr. & A.Gray	1870	var. ovalifolium	= het.
Eriogonum purpureum (Nutt.) Nutt. ex Benth.	1856	var. purpureum	≡ hom.
Eriogonum rhodanthum A.Nelson & P.B.Kenn.	1906	var. nivale	= het.
Eriogonum roseiflorum Gand.	1906	var. purpureum	= het.
Eriogonum rubidum Gand.	1906	var. rubidum	≡ hom.
Eriogonum tenellum Nutt.	1848	var. purpureum	= het., nom. illeg. homonym. post.
Eriogonum vineum Small	1898	var. vineum	≡ hom.
Eucycla ovalifolia (Nutt.) Nutt.	1848	E. ovalifolium	≡ hom.
Eucycla purpurea Nutt.	1848	var. purpureum	≡ hom.
Notes: ≡ homotypic synonym; = heterotypic synonym

== Range ==
Cushion buckwheat is native to southwestern Canada and the western United States as far east as the Rocky Mountain states. In Canada it only grows naturally in British Columbia and Alberta. It grows in every state of the northwest from Washington and Oregon east through Idaho to the western two-thirds of Montana and Wyoming. To the south in Colorado it only grows in the westernmost counties and likewise only grows in San Juan County, New Mexico. In the southwestern US it is common throughout Utah and Nevada, but only found in northern Arizona and eastern California.
