= Macrocirca =

Scientific classification
- Domain: Eukaryota
- Kingdom: Animalia
- Phylum: Arthropoda
- Class: Insecta
- Order: Lepidoptera
- Family: Depressariidae
- Genus: Macrocirca; Meyrick in Rosen, 1931
- Species: M. strabo

Binomial name
- Macrocirca strabo Meyrick, 1931

Genus of moths

Macrocirca is a genus of moths in the family Depressariidae. It contains only two species,

- Macrocirca moseri Becker, 2023 (southern Brazil)
- Macrocirca strabo (Meyrick, 1931), from Argentina & Brazil.
