= Ethmia pylonotella =

Scientific classification
- Kingdom: Animalia
- Phylum: Arthropoda
- Class: Insecta
- Order: Lepidoptera
- Family: Depressariidae
- Genus: Ethmia
- Species: E. pylonotella

Binomial name
- Ethmia pylonotella Viette, 1956

Species of moth

Ethmia pylonotella is a moth in the family Depressariidae, described by Pierre Viette in 1956 from Madagascar.
