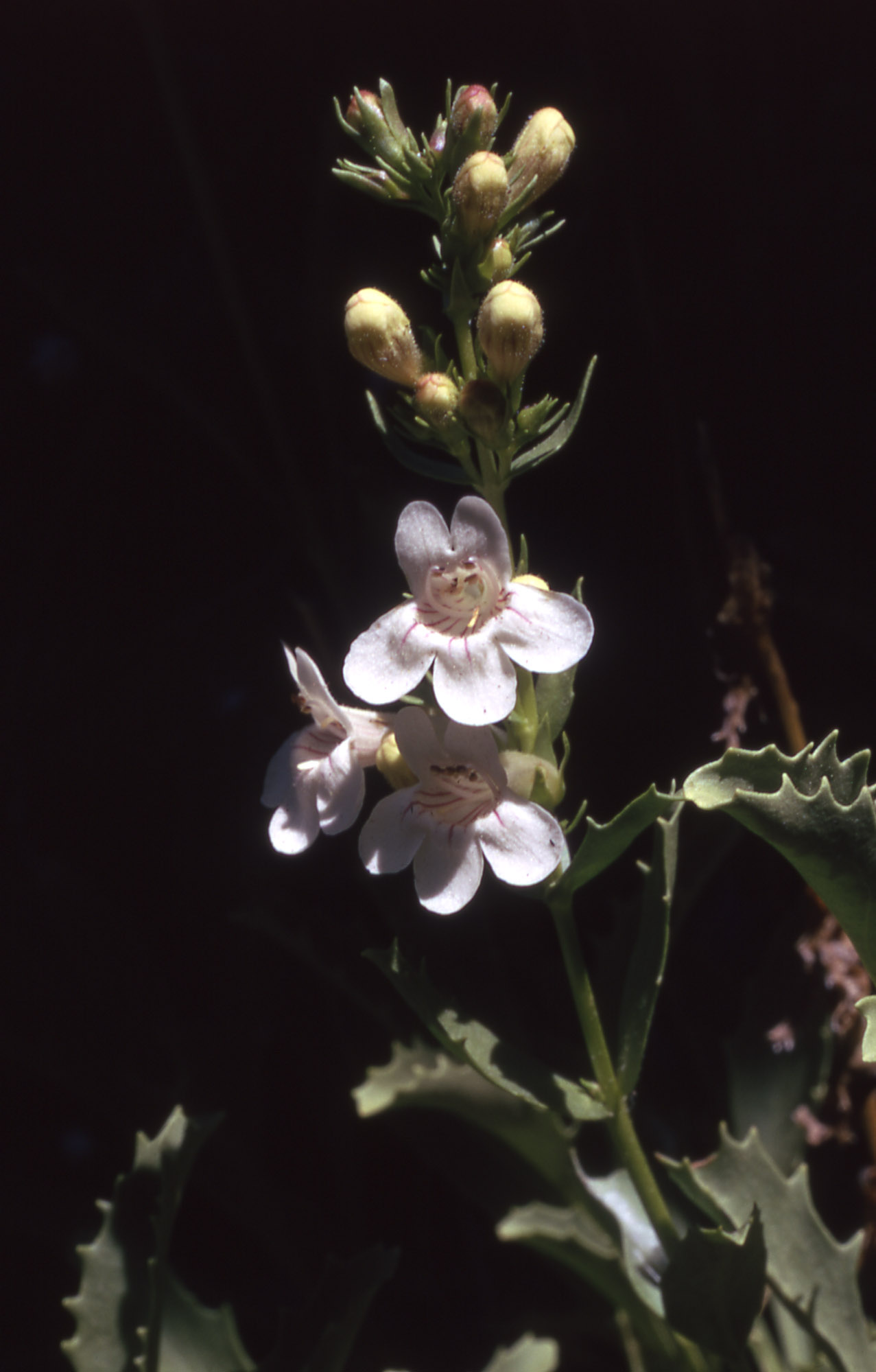

Conservation status
- Secure (NatureServe)

Scientific classification
- Kingdom: Plantae
- Clade: Tracheophytes
- Clade: Angiosperms
- Clade: Eudicots
- Clade: Asterids
- Order: Lamiales
- Family: Plantaginaceae
- Genus: Penstemon
- Species: P. deustus

Binomial name
- Penstemon deustus Douglas

Varieties
- P. deustus var. deustus; P. deustus var. pedicellatus M.E.Jones; P. deustus var. suffrutescens L.F.Hend.; P. deustus var. variabilis (Suksd.) Cronquist

Synonyms
- Penstemon deustus subsp. typicus D.D.Keck

= Penstemon deustus =

Plant species in the plantain family

Penstemon deustus is a species of penstemon known by the common names hotrock penstemon and scabland penstemon. It is native to much of the northwestern United States from the Pacific Northwest to Wyoming, where it grows in many types of forest and open plateau habitat, often on soils heavy in volcanic rock or on limestone outcrops.

== Description ==
Penstemon deustus is a subshrub, a plant with a largely herbaceous character, but somewhat woody at its base. Its stems grow from a woody caudex with many branches that may be as much as 1 centimeter thick. It may also have leafy shoots that do not produce flowers. It stems range in size from 6 to 60 cm, but usually are taller than 15 cm. They may be nearly hairless, but are more often covered in small, stiff, backwards facing hairs and are never waxy. The stems may lay down on the ground, grow outwards a short distance before curving to grow upwards, or grow straight upwards.

The leaves can be hairless or covered in glandular hairs and have edges that are shallowly to deeply toothed. All the leaves are cauline, attached to the stems rather than to the base of the plant, and are not leathery. Like the stems they may be hairless or retrorsely hairy and might be attached on opposite sides of the stems, nearly opposite, or arranged in whorls. Stems will usually have five to nine pairs of leaves, attached by petioles or directly to the stem.

The inflorescence is 6 to 30 centimeters at the top of a stem and produces five to eleven groups of flowers. Each group will have a pair of bracts and two cymes, each with one to six flowers. The tubular flowers have two lips with five-lobes. The glandular flower is cream in color with dark lining and reaches 1.5 cm in length.

== Taxonomy ==
The scientific description and name of Penstemon deustus was first published by David Douglas in 1830. It has four varieties according to Plants of the World Online.

- Penstemon deustus var. deustus
- Penstemon deustus var. pedicellatus
- Penstemon deustus var. suffrutescens
- Penstemon deustus var. variabilis

It also has 9 synonyms of the species or one of its varieties.

Table of Synonyms
Name	Year	Rank	Synonym of:	Notes
Penstemon deustus subsp. heterander (Torr. & A.Gray) Pennell & D.D.Keck	1940	subspecies	var. pedicellatus	= het.
Penstemon deustus var. heterander (Torr. & A.Gray) M.Peck	1941	variety	var. pedicellatus	= het.
Penstemon deustus subsp. typicus D.D.Keck	1940	subspecies	P. deustus	≡ hom. not validly publ.
Penstemon deustus subsp. variabilis (Suksd.) Pennell & D.D.Keck	1940	subspecies	var. variabilis	≡ hom.
Penstemon deustus var. savagei L.F.Hend.	1931	variety	var. deustus	= het.
Penstemon heterander Torr. & A.Gray	1857	species	var. pedicellatus	= het.
Penstemon ilicifolius Nutt. ex Benth.	1846	species	var. deustus	= het.
Penstemon paniculatus Howell	1901	species	var. variabilis	= het.
Penstemon variabilis Suksd.	1900	species	var. variabilis	≡ hom.
Notes: ≡ homotypic synonym; = heterotypic synonym

=== Names ===
In English it is known by the common names scabland penstemon, hotrock penstemon, or scorched penstemon.

== Range and habitat ==
Penstemon deustus has a range that extends over parts or most of eight western US states. It grows in much of Eastern Washington and all but the northwest corner of Oregon. It also grows in California to the north of San Francisco Bay in the North Coast Ranges into the Klamath Range and Cascades. They also may be found in the northern and central Sierra Nevada. It is very widespread in Nevada, being recorded in every county except for Lincoln County. Similarly it is found in much of Idaho. However it is only known from two southwestern counties of Montana, three western counties in Wyoming, and just Box Elder County in northwest Utah.

This species grows in dry rocky locations, very often on basalt rocks, but also sometimes on limestone.

=== Conservation ===
In 1992 NatureServe evaluated Penstemon deustus and rated it secure (G5). At the state level they evaluated it as secure (S5) in Washington state and apparently secure (S4) in Nevada. They rated it vulnerable (S3) in Wyoming and critically imperiled (S1) in Utah, but did not evaluate it at the state level across the rest of its range.

== Uses ==
This plant is used in wilderness revegetation and landscaping projects in its native region. It is favored for its low water needs and its abundant flowers which attract pollinators, including honey bees, bumblebees, sweat bees, and leafcutter bees.

== See also ==
- List of Penstemon species
