= Stamp rally =

Event for collecting stamps of a certain theme

A stamp rally (スタンプラリー, sutanpu rarī) is an event or course dedicated to collecting stamps that follow a certain theme at sites such as train stations, rest areas, tourist attractions, museums, zoos, onsen towns, shopping malls, and other locations. The popularity of stamp rallies in Japan started with the phenomenon of eki stamps. The distinction is that stamp rallies usually follow a certain theme and only appear for a limited time, in contrast to standard eki stamps bearing the likeness of a station, which are usually available forever, or until they are redesigned. The term "stamp rally" is a wasei-eigo invention.

In addition to rallies organized by chain stores, railroad companies, or travel agencies, rallies can also be organized by tourist associations in local cities. Some people do not participate in rallies to receive special benefits or prizes, but rather engage with stamps as a personal hobby, stamping their own stamp books as they find them wherever they go, regardless of the type. Some stamp rallies focus on historic sites, such as the Japan Castle Foundation's "100 Famous Castles in Japan", which has included a stamp rally since 2007.

Like the eki stamp, stamp rallies replicate a history inherited from the shuin stamps provided at sacred sites like Buddhist temples and Shinto shrines, especially on the routes of pilgrimages. Stamp rallies have some conceptual commonalities with the long-running Passport to Your National Parks campaign in the United States.

In some cases, rather than filling a book with each stamp in a dedicated box, a stamp rally might be designed to encourage layering color-separated stamps over the same spot with different colors of ink to give a similar effect to screen printing with multiple plates. This way, visiting each station of the rally is required to view all the layers of the stamp. Stamps of this type are known in Japanese as kasane-oshi sutanpu (重ね捺しスタンプ) and are often manufactured by the company Shachihata.

Japan Railways, major private railway and subway companies, and bus companies sometimes hold stamp rallies during spring, summer, and winter vacations. Stamp rallies conducted in collaboration with various media properties are also held, such as television dramas, films, anime, and video games. Many are themed around mascot characters. Stamp rally tie-ins for children's anime series, such as Anpanman, are especially popular. Some stamp rallies, such as those at roadside stations, are held throughout the year.

Often, stamp rallies conducted in collaboration with anime or television series set in contemporary Japan focus on the many types of landmark locations featured in the work, rather than working with singular private transportation companies or chain businesses. These can be seen as public–private collaborations with local municipal governments, film associations, chambers of commerce, shopping streets, or tourism associations as a means of encouraging and rewarding seichi junrei, rather than corporate partnerships. Some examples include the third season of Laid-Back Camp and Edomae Elf.

== Railways ==
=== Pokemon ===
==== East Japan Rail Company (JR East) tie-ins ====
Since 1997 East Japan Railway Company (JR East) has been conducting an annual project to place stamps of characters and creatures from the Pokémon franchise at major stations in the Tokyo metropolitan area during the summer vacation period of elementary and junior high school students (except in 2001–2002, 2016, and 2020–2022). In some years, participants could win limited-edition trading cards.

In 1997, stamps were placed at 30 stations in the Tokyo metropolitan area, and from 1998, at a dozen stations on the Yamanote Line. In 2003, the number was expanded to 83 stations, including those covered by the "Holiday Pass" (the predecessor of the Holiday Outing Pass). In 2005, 100 stamps were placed at 97 stations, and long lines formed every day at stations with stamps of popular characters. Since 2004, two of the stamps have been placed at Tokyo Monorail stations, a member of the JR East Group. In 2011, due to the Great East Japan Earthquake, the "Pokemon B&W Stamp Rally" was reduced to a simple rally in which participants could choose one of 12 stations along two courses on the Yamanote Line and collect stamps at six stations. In 2013, the scope was expanded again to include the "Holiday Outing Pass", and the installation of stamps at Tokyo Monorail stations (one out of all stamps) resumed. In 2017, the number was increased to 50 stations, and in 2018 to 55 stations. In 2023, in commemoration of the Pokémon World Championships held in Yokohama, the "JR East Pokémon World Championships 2023 Stamp Rally" was held. The "Metropolitan Area Course" included stamps from 10 stations (or three of them) within the scope of the "Holiday Pass" and "Nombiri Holiday Suica Pass," while the "Shinkansen Course" included stamps from only one of five designated Shinkansen stations in the Tōhoku, Jōetsu, and Hokuriku regions.

From 1997 to 2000 participation was based on an advance application system. Since 1998, the rally has been held on Saturdays and Sundays, and the number of participants has been limited. Since 2003, the rally has been open to all participants and requires a ticket to each station, a free train ticket, and a Suica. From 2006 to 2010, Summer Vacation Timetable: Pokemon Stamp Rally Special Edition (夏休み時刻表 ポケモン・スタンプラリー特別号) was published by Kotsu Shinbunsha and served as the official guidebook for the rally, and was commonly known as the "Pokemon Timetable". In 2019, stamp books was distributed at all stations where stamps were installed to collect all the stamps.

In 2005 the stamps (Pokémon) at stations alternated between even-numbered days and odd-numbered days, a behavior that was replicated in the 2015 rally. For example, Lombre was available on even-numbered days in 2005, and Snorlax on odd-numbered days; Chespin was available on even days in 2015, and Chesnaught on the odd days.

In 1998 and 1999 the stamps of the characters were installed, and in 2019 they were installed for the first time in 20 years.

From 2006 to 2010 and 2012 to 2015 some stations were secret stations, where the Pokémon was not identified at all until the stamp was placed. In 2015, the station where the stamp was placed was also a secret.

In 1997 the first year of the stamp rally, participants collected stamps of all 30 stations in the Tokyo metropolitan area in less than two days. Until 2010, the prize is exchanged at Tokyo, Shinjuku, Ikebukuro, Shinagawa, Ueno, and Matsudo stations at the end of the stamp rally. In 2013, a souvenir and a certificate of achievement were distributed, followed by a certificate of achievement with a different design for each of the six stations when the stamps of the remaining stations were collected. In 2015, a certificate of achievement was distributed for each of the remaining stations. In 2017, a souvenir for each area achieved was distributed for each of the remaining stations, and a souvenir that also served as a certificate of achievement was distributed for all stations achieved. In 2018 and 2019, a souvenir that also served as a certificate of achievement was distributed for each of the remaining stations achieved afterwards. In 2011–2015, only Shinjuku and Ueno Stations exchanged prizes upon completion. In 2017, only 6 stations were completed at 12 designated Ekinka stores in the area, and only Ueno Station (which also completed 6 stations) exchanged prizes upon completion of the area and all stations. 2018 and 2019, only 6 stations were completed at designated stations in the area (11 stations in 2018). In 2018 and 2019, only 6 stations were completed at NewDays stores in designated stations (11 stations in 2018 and 9 stations in 2019) in the area (in the case of stations with multiple stores, only designated stores were completed), and prizes were exchanged only at Tokyo and Ikebukuro stations (where 6 stations were also completed) when all stations were completed.

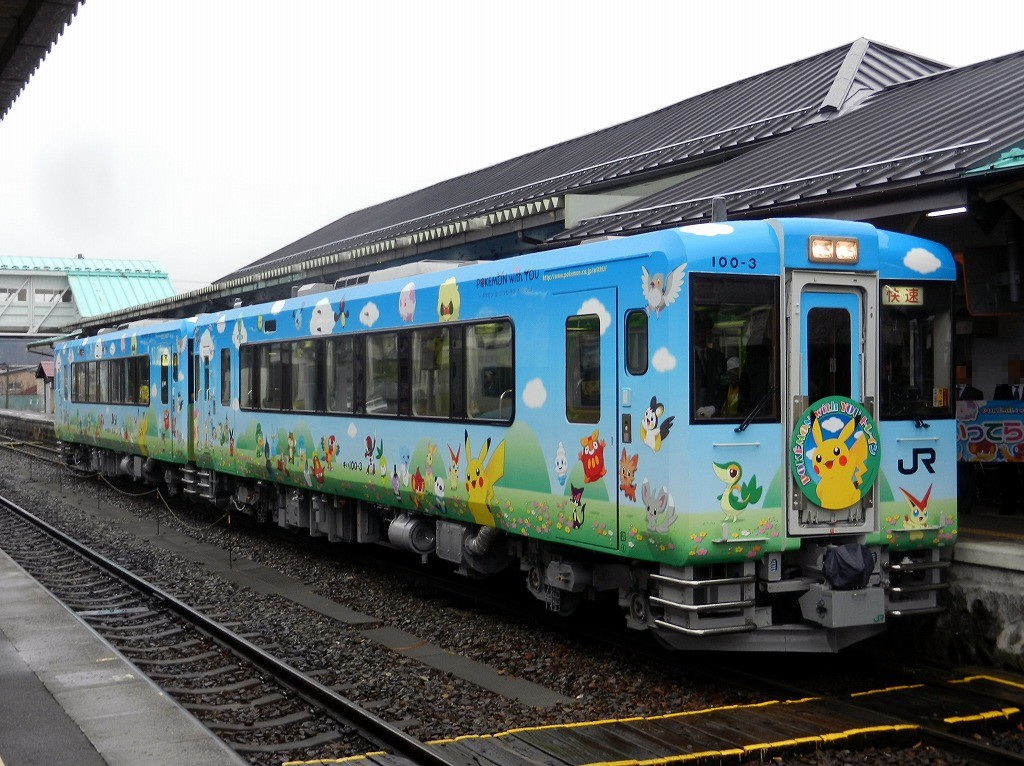
JR East KiHa 100 series 2-car "Pokemon With You" train

In conjunction with the stamp rally period, the Yamanote Line operated tie-in "Pokémon trains" in 2000, 2002, 2005, and 2010. The train bodies were covered with Pokémon character stickers, and the ads and LCD screens inside the trains were united with Pokémon-related items. The trains were operated on the Chuo and Sobu Lines (at various stations) in 2004, and on the Tokyo Monorail from 2006 to 2016 and in 2019. Because this year in 2026 is 30th anniversary of Pokemon (made in 1996), this rally is execpetionally large. The rally started in July 16th to August 31st (one day after for people reading in America). It featured nostalgic layout showcasing original starting Pokemon from every single generation along side modern favorites. For the first time, selected JR stations did not just feature only one Pokémon. To celebrate the 30th anniversary, several stations showcase entire starter trios on a single stamp!

The Sendai area has also hosted the event in 1998 and from 2012 to 2014.

==== Pokémon stamp rallies conducted by other businesses ====
Railways

- West Japan Railway Company (JR West) – 1998–2000, 2007–2016. In 2007 the program was implemented in JR West's Urban Network area and Hiroshima/Yamaguchi areas. After another development, an ICOCA card had to be presented.
- Nagoya Railroad – 2001, 2007–2018. Three times in spring, June, and summer in 2007, and twice in spring and summer from 2008 to 2014.
- Nishi-Nippon Railroad – 2001
- Osaka Metro – 2003, 2006, 2018. In 2003 and 2006, planned as the predecessor (before privatization) Osaka Municipal Subway
- Hankyu Corporation – 2004
- Kobe Municipal Subway – 2006
- Hokkaido Railway Company – 2008–2010
- Fukuoka City Subway – 2008
- Kyushu Railway Company – 2009–2015
- Sapporo City Transportation Bureau – 2013–2019
- Sendai City Transportation Bureau – 2019
- AbukumaExpress – 2022

Tourism associations

- Mie Prefecture Tourism Federation – 2024–2025

Convenience stores

- Seven-Eleven Japan – 2014–2015

Highways

- Nakanihon Exis – 2008–2009 (Conducted at NEXCO Central Japan service and parking area)

=== Tour format ===
In addition to regular stamp rallies, JR West also organizes stamp rallies that are combined with travel products, in which the stamps are not at stations on specific lines, but at all locations at specific sightseeing spots. In the past, Naruto, The Kindaichi Case Files, and Detective School Q have been used. Travel products are available through JR West's travel agency, Nippon Travel Agency, as well as JTB, Kinki Nippon Tourist, and JR Shikoku's Warp.

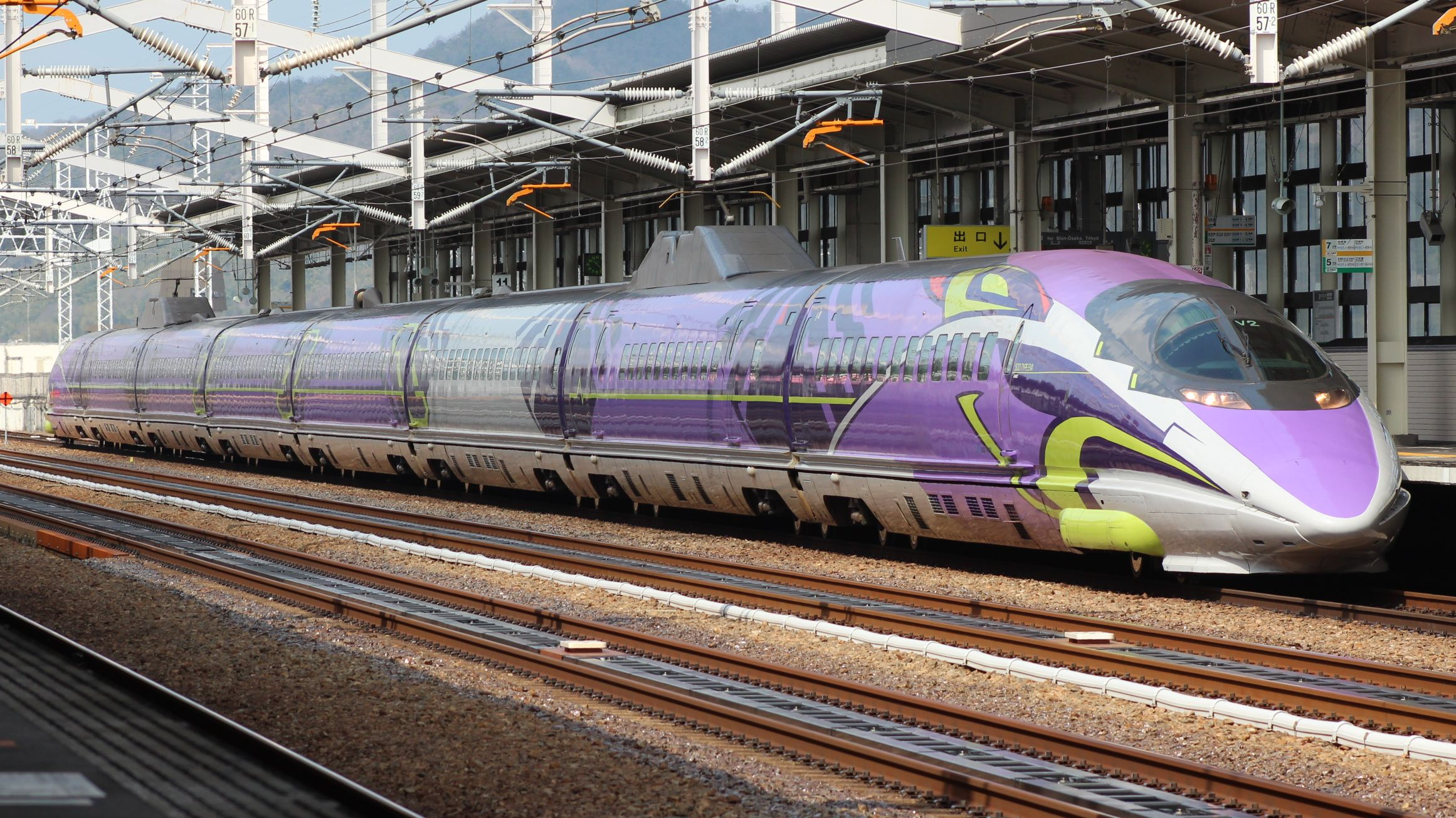
The JRW-500 Evangelion bullet train

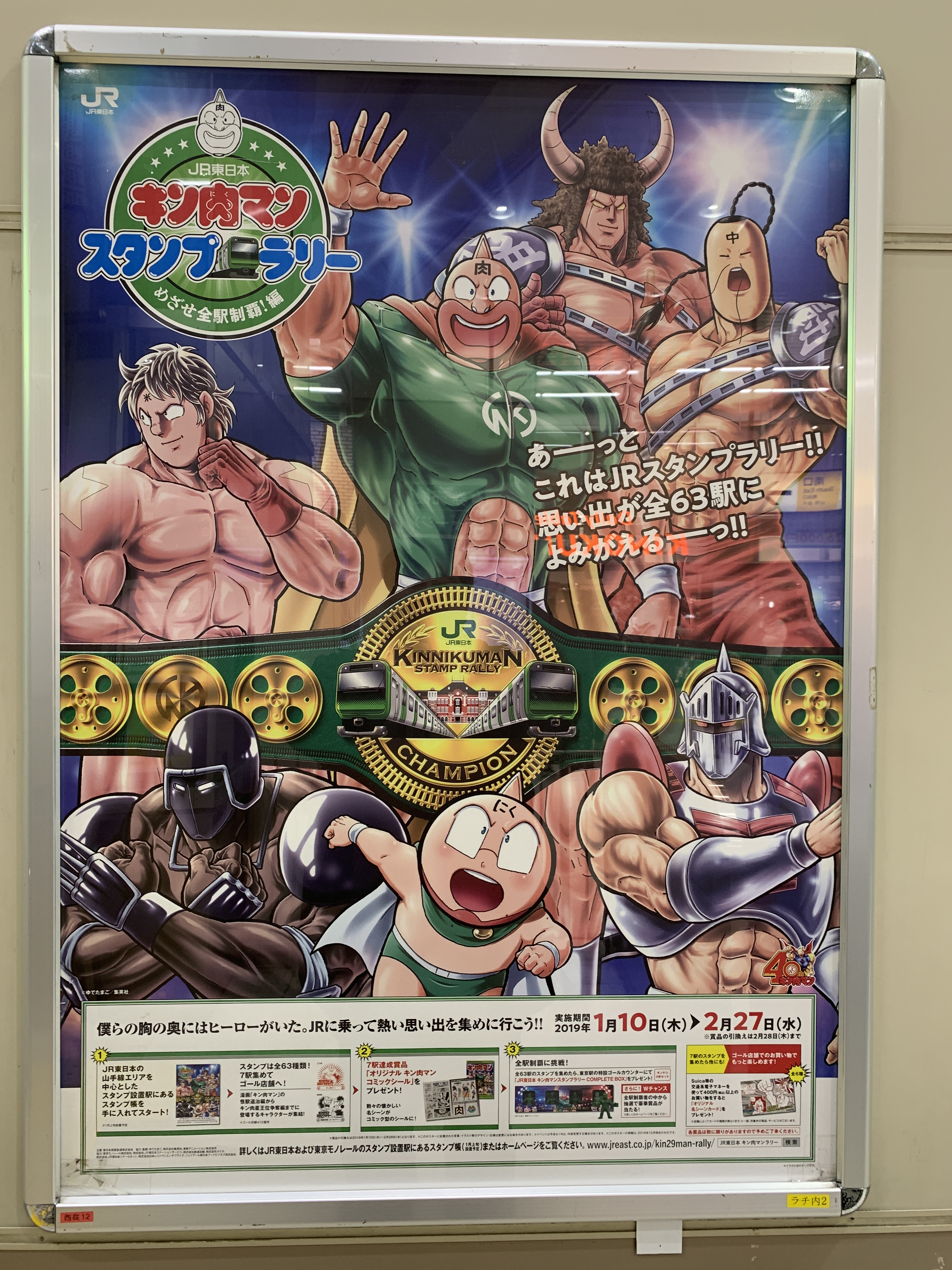
Poster for the East Japan Railway Company 2019 Kinnikuman stamp rally

=== East Japan Rail Company (JR East) ===
Apart from Pokémon, JR East has conducted stamp rally tie-ins with several other series.

==== Past collaborations ====
- 2016 - Neon Genesis Evangelion 20th anniversary, including a wrapped bullet train, the "500 Type EVA"
- 2019 - Kinnikuman
- 2023
  - Plarail
  - Sumikko Gurashi

=== Tokyo Metro ===
Tokyo Metro operates subway the lines in the Tokyo metropolitan area.

- 1999 - Shenmue
- Summer 2023 - Studio Ghibli

=== Seibu Railway ===
Seibu Railway, with some anime production companies scattered along its lines, has held stamp rallies for many animation productions. In particular, the 2014 stamp rally featuring Yokai Watch was one of the company's biggest hits, with prize cards in short supply and lines forming at stations where stamps of popular characters were placed.

==== Past collaborations ====
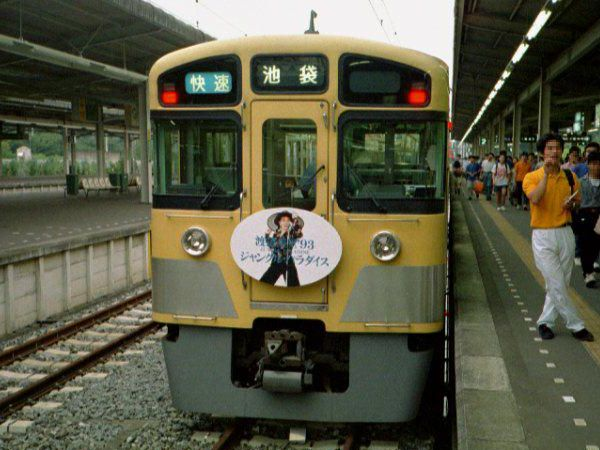
A Seibu train advertising Misato Watanabe's JUNGLE PARADISE concert. Trains operating during Seibu stamp rally collaborations have similar oval advertisements placed at the head of the train.

- 2008
  - Hello Kitty
  - Sgt. Frog (Spring)
- 2009 – Fresh Pretty Cure!
- 2010 – Heart Catch PreCure!
- 2011
  - Kaizoku Sentai Gokaiger
  - Suite PreCure
  - Cardfight!! Vanguard
- 2012
  - Smile PreCure!
  - Tokumei Sentai Go-Busters the Movie
- 2013 – The Wind Rises
- 2014 – Yokai Watch
- 2015
  - Moyasimon: Tales of Agriculture & Maria the Virgin Witch (Winter)
  - Dragon Ball Z: Resurrection 'F' (Golden Week)
  - Shaun the Sheep Movie (Before Summer)
  - Yokai Watch (Summer)
- 2016
  - Kamisama Minarai: Himitsu no Cocotama (Golden Week)
  - Aikatsu Stars! (Summer)
- 2017
  - Kamisama Minarai: Himitsu no Cocotama (Golden Week)
  - Snack World (Summer)
  - Love Live! Sunshine!! (Autumn)
- 2018
  - Love Live! Sunshine!! (Early Summer)
  - Gudetama (Summer)
  - The Idolmaster Cinderella Girls (November)
- 2019
  - Koupen-chan
  - The Lion King (2019 live-action)
  - Love Live! School Idol Festival ~after school ACTIVITY～ Next Stage (also implemented in-game)
- 2020
  - Hypnosis Mic: Division Rap Battle
  - Doraemon: Nobita's New Dinosaur
  - Stand by Me Doraemon 2
- 2022
  - Doraemon: Nobita's Little Star Wars 2021
  - Love Live! Superstar!!
  - Strawberry Prince
- 2023
  - Doraemon: Nobita's Sky Utopia
  - Yohane the Parhelion: Sunshine in the Mirror

=== Sagami Railway ===
Sagami Railway's stamp rally has stamps at a total of 25 stations on the Sotetsu Main Line and Sotetsu Izumino Line. All 25 stations have different designs, and the number of stamps is larger than in other stamp rallies. In recent years, the number of stations with stamps has been reduced.

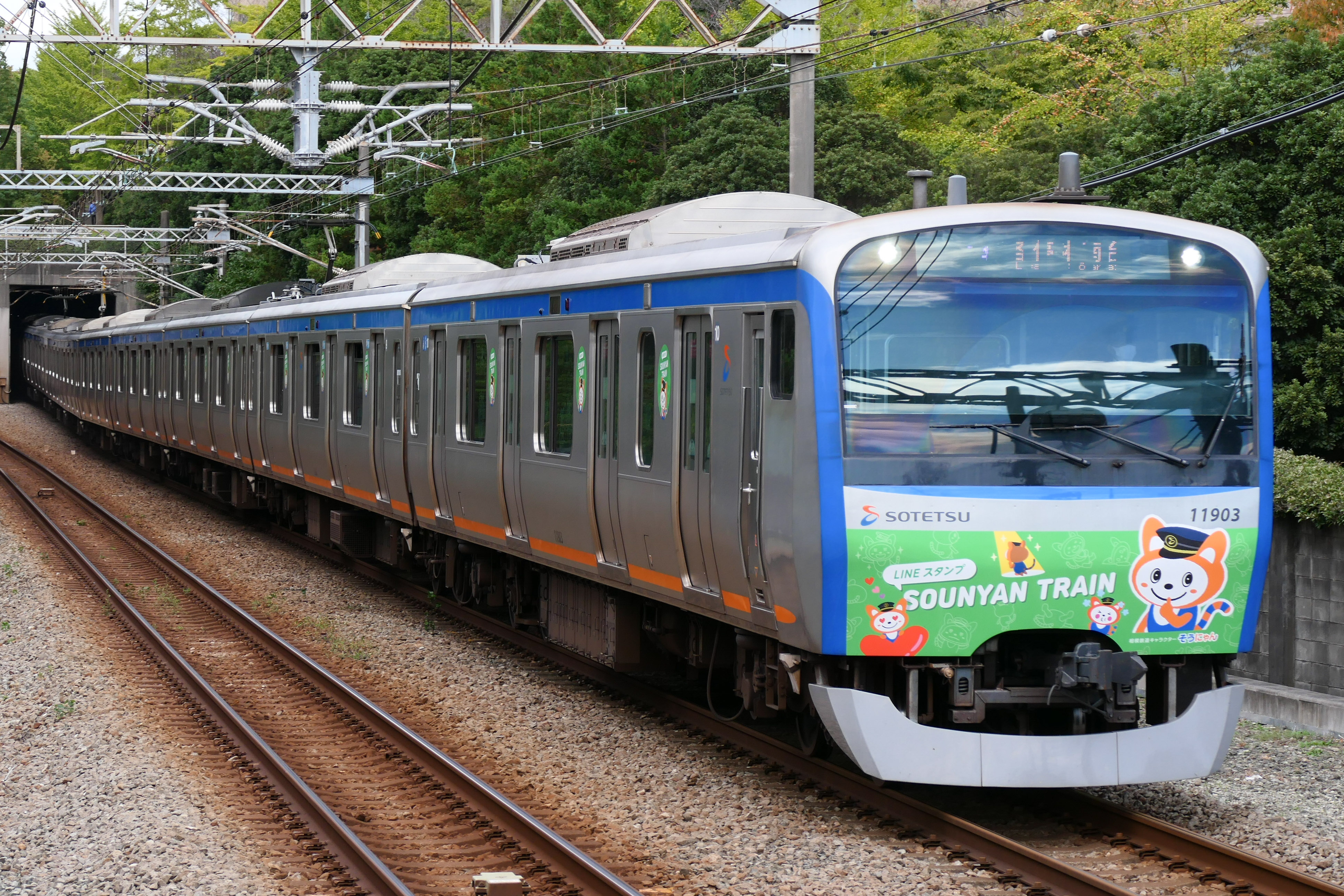
Sagami Railway Series 11000 Sounyan Train

==== Past collaborations ====
- 2008 and 2010 – previous trains that ran on the Sotetsu Line
- 2009 – Animals located at Yokohama Zoo and Tanemaru
- 2011 and 2012 – Sotetsu Line and local trains in Tohoku
- 2013 – Local mascot characters along the Sotetsu line
- 2014 – Ultraman
- 2015 – Sounyan and Sotetsu Line trains
- 2016 – Sounyan and Sotetsu Line trains (stations reduced)
- 2017 – Sounyan and Sotetsu Line trains (stations reduced)
- 2023 – Sounyan

== Convenience stores ==
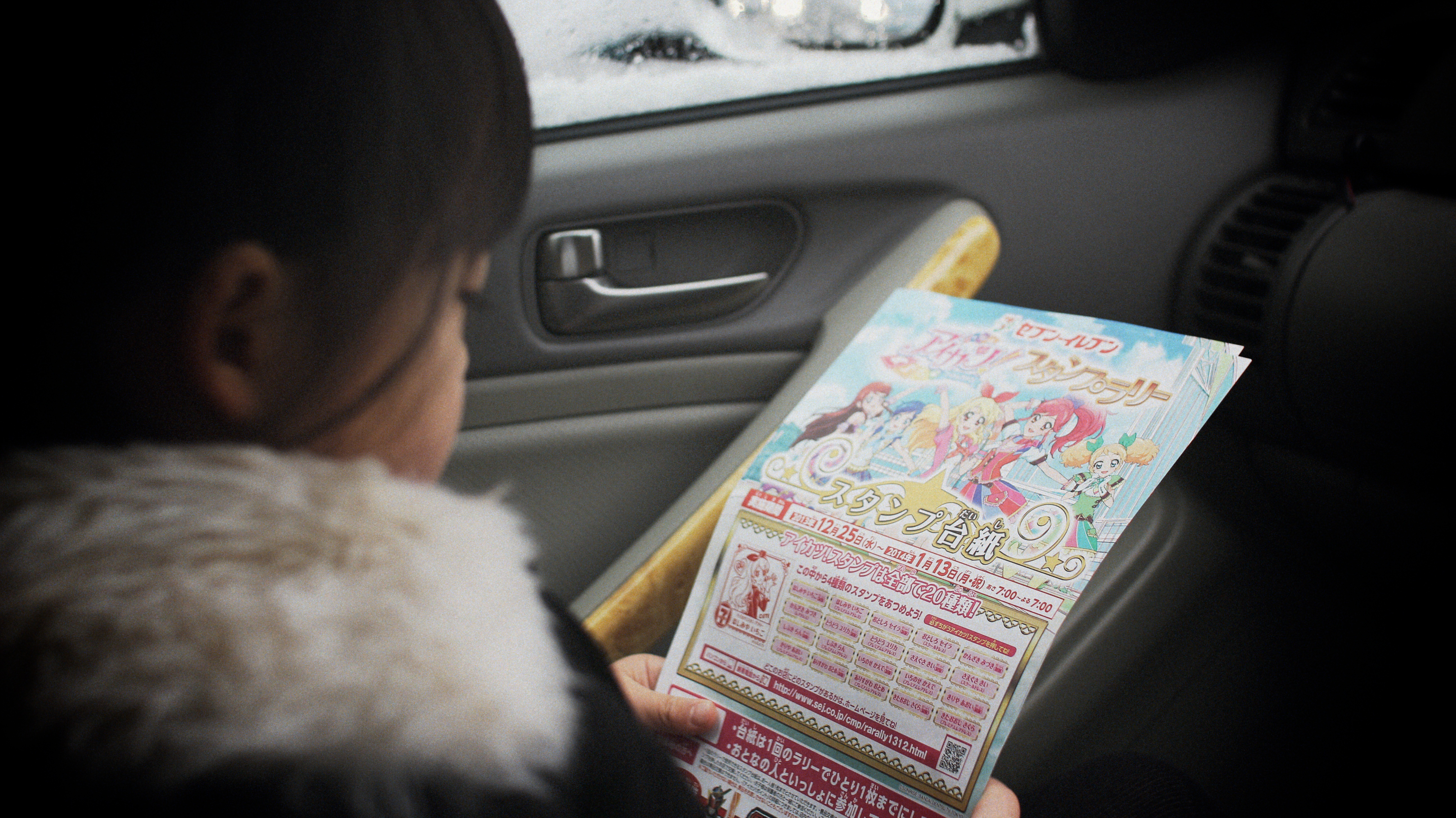
A girl participating in the 2013 7-Eleven Aikatsu! stamp rally

Convenience stores are also occasional stamp rally collaborators, or will otherwise use the aesthetics of a stamp rally to conduct rewards programs.

=== Lawson ===
- 2021 - Neon Genesis Evangelion

=== Seven-Eleven Japan ===
- 2013-2014 - Aikatsu! and Kamen Rider

=== Seicomart ===
- 2019 - Seicomart

== Conventions ==
Stamp rallies are common features at anime conventions, trade fairs, and conventions or expositions dedicated to Japanese or world cultures, both in Japan and internationally. In a common arrangement at anime conventions, attendees who purchase goods over a certain cost threshold at participating booths become eligible for a stamp. After completing a stamp book, they may earn a prize, usually a free merchandise item. In some cases, the purchased goods must pertain to a certain media property, and the reward is related to said property. In other cases, the reward pool is more general in nature or involves the convention itself, like a special pin. These programs may either be designed by the managers of the event or arranged among a group of independently acting booth vendors.

- AnimeJapan at Tokyo Big Sight
- World Expo 2005, Aichi Prefecture - European Union member countries
- Anime Expo Chibi
- PopCon Indy
- Anime Gaming Con of Fresno, California
- Virtual Market, produced by Japanese Virtual Reality startup HIKKY, allows users to participate in a virtual convention stamp rally in VRChat.

== Roadside stations ==
Stamp rallies are held at roadside stations (michi no eki, 道の駅) throughout Japan for each region (the jurisdiction of the regional development bureaus of the Ministry of Land, Infrastructure, Transport and Tourism). The 2023-2024 Hokkaido michi no eki rally included 127 participating stations.

=== Roadside station QSL card stamping ===
Some Japan Amateur Radio League members affiliated with Kuji Sunkist Club, JR7YKK, issue Michi-no-Eki QRV (道の駅QRV) awards to amateur radio operators for collecting QSL cards and stamping them at roadside stations close to the sender. A special-purpose database software utility was created for logging stamped QSL cards called Michi-no-Eki Get's (道の駅 Get's).

== Compensatory activities ==
The following are examples of stamp rallies that are not designed as travel stamp rallies, but commemorate the use of services provided by financial institutions, chain stores, government offices, etc. that are located across a wide area. The goal for hobbyists is to collect some proof of use.

=== Travel savings ===
Deposits and withdrawals are made at local post offices, etc., and are commemorated by receiving a post office seal.

=== Financial Institutions ===
==== Resona Meguri ====
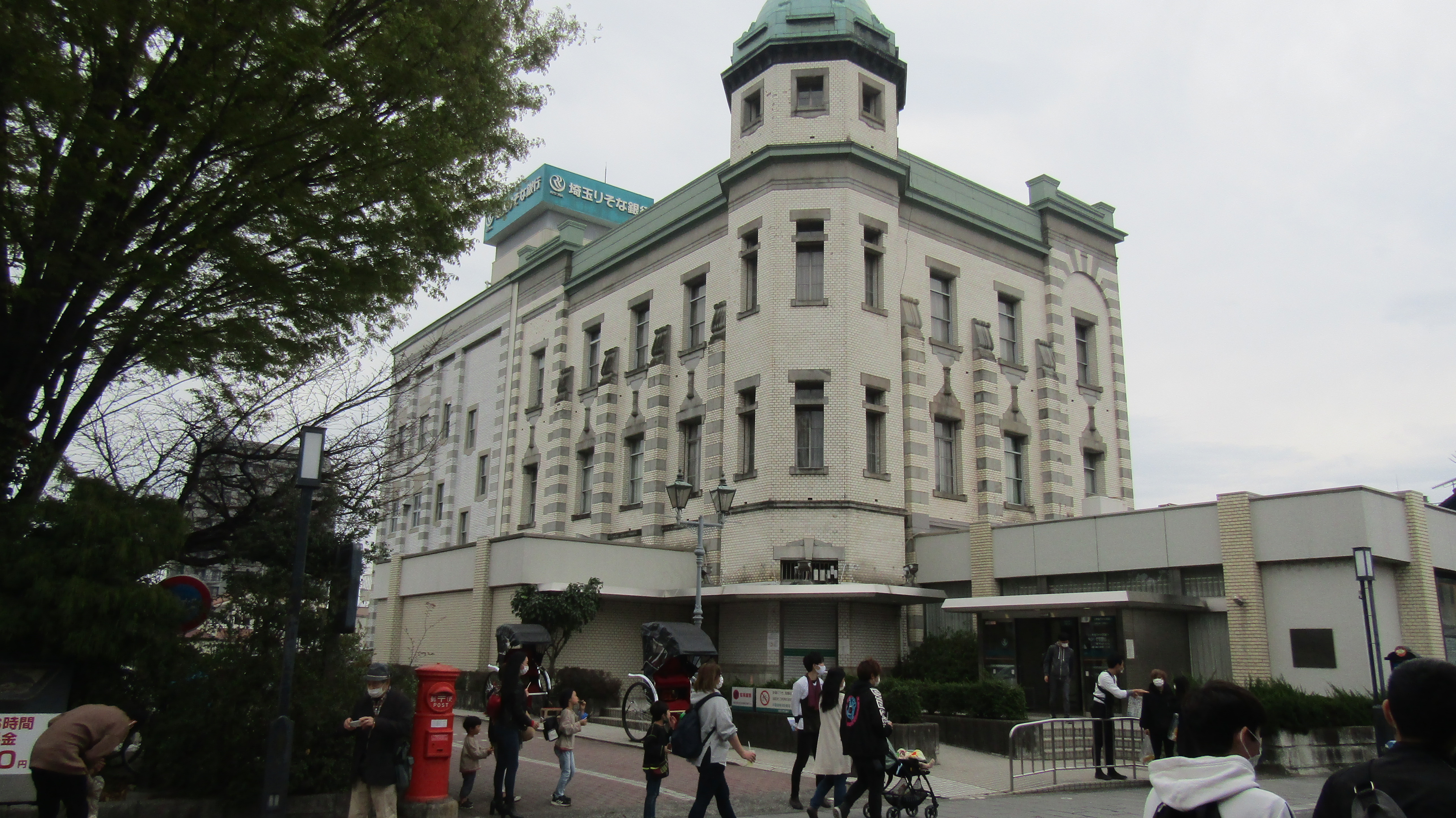
Saitama Resona Bank

Resona Meguri (りそなめぐり) is a stamping-related hobby in which participants visit the former Asahi Bank (Resona Bank, Saitama Resona Bank) and make deposits to have the name of the head office or branch of the bank concerned printed in their Kurashi no Tsucho (passbook for daily life). Some people collect them at former Asahi Bank branches because the name of the main branch is printed in kanji characters on the passbook when depositing at a cash machine (however, when using an ATM at the account branch, the name of the branch is not listed and is left blank).

In the past, even the name of the branch office of non-branch ATMs was accurately displayed, so there were some enthusiasts who went there, but now the name of the home branch that has jurisdiction over the ATM is displayed. However, nowadays, ATMs in Resona Personal Stations also display the name of the home branch if the branch code is the same as that of the home branch. When using BankTime, "RBT-XXXXXXXXX" is displayed instead of the branch name, which is a 7-digit number that corresponds to the unique code of the location where the ATM is used.

The name of the ATM branch outside the store is not printed, but the name of the mother store is printed. When a transaction is made at another bank, the name of the bank is printed or the financial institution code and branch code are printed.

Branches that are inaccessible or require permission to use include the House of Representatives Branch, the House of Councillors Branch, and the Osaka Sales Department JR West Sub-Branch.

- The House of Councillors Branch is located in the House of Councillors Building and can be accessed from the general customer counter, but may not be available due to security reasons.
  - There is also an ATM under the jurisdiction of the House of Councillors Branch in the National Diet Library. (General customers can also use the ATM.) The House of Representatives branch is located in the first annex of the House of Representatives.
- The House of Representatives branch is located in the first annex of the House of Representatives and is not accessible unless there is a legitimate or special reason due to security reasons at the reception desk. The same applies to the JR West Branch located in the headquarters of West Japan Railway Company (JR West).

==== Equivalent at regional banks ====
Other regional banks, such as Michinoku Bank and Ogaki Kyoritsu Bank, may do the same.

In the case of Michinoku Bank, it is also displayed at the account store. In particular, in the case of Michinoku Bank, it is also called Michinoku Meguri. Regional banks may not have ATMs at some of their branches, such as those in Tokyo, so in this case, they are printed only at the counter.

There are cases where this was possible before but has since been phased out. Kagawa Bank, Aozora Bank, and Daishi Houketsu Bank, in January 2007, May 2016, and January 2017, respectively, discontinued branch name printing when they updated their core banking account systems.

==== Others ====
Although it varies from financial institution to financial institution, in some cases, the branch number of the branch where the deposit or withdrawal was made is printed when the deposit or withdrawal is made. Mizuho Bank also falls into this category, but in its case, the Shibuya Chuo Branch Broadcast Center Sub-Branch (branch number 165, located in the restricted area of the NHK Broadcasting Center) cannot be accessed. In rare cases, such as at MUFG Bank and Chugoku Bank, the store number of the branch where the book was written is printed regardless of the type of transaction. In the case of Sumitomo Mitsui Banking Corporation, the store number is printed on the passbook when using an ATM of a non-branch location.

Depending on the financial institution, there are cases in which the branch code is printed in a dedicated field, or in the Abstract field or the Deposit/Payment field.

=== Mister Donut Card campaign ===
Mister Donut Meguri (ミスタードーナツ巡り) is another travel-related hobby involving visiting Mister Donut locations and purchasing more than 300 worth of merchandise to receive and collect the store's MisDo Card (ミスドカード), formerly known as the Lucky Card(ラッキーカード).

This is often practiced by people who engage with travel savings activities.

When it comes to the details, different enthusiasts have different opinions:

- Whether or not a store is considered a separate store before and after a name change
- Whether or not before and after store relocation is considered a separate store
- Whether or not the store is regarded as a separate store before and after changing the store number
- Whether or not a satellite store is permitted

On November 26, 2006, the "MisDo Card Campaign" ended and the distribution of MisDo Cards was discontinued. On December 1 of the same year, "Misdo Club" was launched nationwide, shifting to a point card system. Customers began receiving and collecting store-numbered MisDo Club point cards, receipts, and advertisements with coupons.

However, the "MisDo Club Point Card" was discontinued on September 30, 2013 (the card was completely discontinued in 2014 after one year of validity). Since then, depending on the campaign, the card distribution has been restored and the name of the issuing store has been added to the card, so that this tour is once again possible as in the past.

=== Lawson receipt collecting ===
Some enthusiasts visit Lawson locations, a major nationwide convenience store chain, and collect receipts.

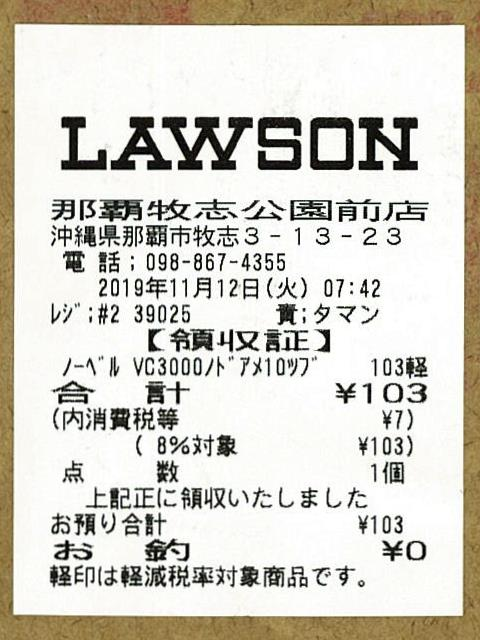
A receipt from Lawson, showing a printed address

Since Lawson was one of the first convenience stores in Japan to expand into all prefectures, it is often seen in travel destinations and is visited while procuring groceries for the trip. In addition, if a customer settles a bill using an SMBC OMC Card, the name of the branch is clearly indicated on the monthly bill, making it easy to manage and catalog visits.

The following is a list of stores that are 'difficult to visit'.

- Stores on university campuses – sometimes located in areas that are off-limits to non-university personnel.
- Stores in expressway parking areas – With few exceptions, stores in these areas are difficult to access from outside the expressway, so most stores are only accessible via the expressway. However, nowadays, the number of places that can be accessed from outside the expressway is increasing, so the degree of difficulty is decreasing compared to the past.
- Narita Airport Branch
- Kansai International Airport Cargo Building
- Corporate facilities – In many cases, these stores are only available to corporate staff. For example, Maihama BFS (Operated by Bay Food Service) is a cast-only branch located backstage at the Tokyo Disney Resort, and is almost impossible for the general public to visit.
- Stores on the premises of the Self-Defense Forces – Usually only available to Self-Defense Force personnel, and due to confidentiality issues, it is next to impossible for the general public to visit these stores. The store on the premises of the General Staff Office in Itami is open to the general public, but only a few times a year at most, so it is difficult for people from far away to visit.

=== CoCo Ichibanya stamp collecting ===
Some people make tours of branches of CoCo Ichibanya, the largest Japanese chain of curry restaurants, sometimes abbreviated to CoCo-Ichi Meguri.

The postcards on the table are stamped with a rubber stamp of the store name and the store number, and in a narrow sense, these are collected as proof of a visit. Various souvenirs are given out at the opening of new stores, and some people travel around the country to collect them. In the past, these were yellow mugs, but recently they have become more diverse, including socks. For example, at the Musashi-Urawa Station East Exit store, which opened on November 24, 2005, the gift was a strap with a whistle attached.

=== Commemorative medal collection ===
Many prominent tourist attractions have commemorative medal vending machines and engraving machines. Some people buy these medals and then use the engraving machines to imprint their names and the date of their visit on the medals for preservation.

=== Game Center Meguri ===
Some people set out to visit game centers, or arcades, all over Japan. In particular, Konami's rhythm game series Beatmania IIDX has an event called "Trip King," (行脚王) which records the number of prefectures and stores where the game is played, as well as the number of game machines played if there are multiple machines in a store, in a "Trip History" (行脚履歴) published on the Internet. Since the game center trip history is reset after the series has been in operation for about a year, some players aim to visit game centers nationwide every time a new installment becomes available.

=== Gotochi card collection ===
- Dam cards
- Manhole cards

== Government documents ==
=== Resident certificate collection ===
Local governments participating in the Basic Resident Registry Network, or Juki Net, can obtain jūminhyō (住民票, resident certificates) from each other. Using this system, some people visit city, ward, town, and village offices and branch offices nationwide to obtain and collect their own residence certificates as a hobby. Because resident certificates are used to register inkan, they are also often stamped. Some people collect various kinds of certificates of residence, and find that the different designs of the certificates, which are unique to each municipality, and the different typefaces of the municipal seals are good keepsakes.

Some enthusiasts aim for jūminhyō with special dates, such as the last day of a municipality that changes its name due to a municipal merger, the first day of a new merged municipality, or the last day of issuing a resident card in the name of the mayor before the municipality becomes an ordinance-designated city. However, as for the first day, it is difficult to obtain them because the resident card net may not be available for several days after the new municipality is inaugurated.

In the case of a vacancy caused by the arrest, sudden death, or resignation of the mayor of a municipality while in office, the name of the issuer, the mayor, is sometimes crossed out with a double line at the end and the name is changed to "deputy mayor". At such a time, hobbyists might also try to collect PR papers.

Examples of specially designed residence certificates are listed below.

- Since Tama, Tokyo is the home of Sanrio Puroland, a certificate of residence with an illustration of Hello Kitty will be issued. However, if you do not specifically request one when applying for the certificate, it will be issued on a regular form. The fee is 400 yen, double that of the standard form.
- Sakaiminato, Tottori issues resident certificates with a watermark of a GeGeGe no Kitarō character's geographical crest. Sakaiminato is the hometown of Kitaro's mangaka. The fee is 300 yen.
- Hokuei, Tottori, which has advertised itself as "Conan Town", is issuing residence certificates using paper with an illustration of a character from Detective Conan. Even with watermarks, the main character, Conan Edogawa, is prominently displayed in the center of the form, which attracted attention to the town office. The fee is 300 yen.

Kuki, Saitama began offering a Lucky Star-themed marriage form in 2020, with character illustrations bounding the intended area for a couple's jitsuin. The fee starts at 350 yen.

=== Collection of border and immigration material ===
Travelers may collect passport stamps in their passports as a hobby, with some seeking to accumulate as many different stamps as possible, while others collect multiple stamps, including duplicates. Passport stamps are generally issued free of charge.

Others decide to leave Japan from a different location from the previous one as much as possible. However, if someone uses an automated immigration terminal, they will not receive a stamp.

== Business behavior ==
When many business sector companies sign a contract with each other, a contract must be drawn up and stamped with the company seal (jitsuin) of each company. This is sometimes colloquially, or jokingly, called a "stamp rally," in which the person in charge of contract administration visits each company to have the company seal stamped. In the worst cases, the stamp rally involves a long trip to the same company to have the seal stamped by visiting the department manager of the staff member in charge of the application, the department manager of the related department, the manager of the procurement department, and the manager of the staff member in charge of the accounting department.

== In popular culture ==
- In Animal Crossing: New Horizons, a virtual stamp rally was held during the International Museum Day event. Nintendo also brought this stamp rally into the real world by collaborating with Hakkeijima Sea Paradise in Yokohama, Umigatari Joetsu Aquarium, and the Seattle Aquarium.
- A stamp rally is held in the 51st episode of Pokémon the Series: Black & White, the 708th overall episode of the Pokémon anime.
- "Merit Stamp Cards" are part of the quest reward system in Ni no Kuni: Wrath of the White Witch. A sheet of stamps must be completed in order to earn a reward ability, and different quests garner different numbers of stamps based on difficulty.
- A stamp rally collection features in Kirby's Return to Dream Land Deluxe for the Nintendo Switch.
- A stamp rally plays a part in the game design of the 2016 Grasshopper Manufacture free-to-play title, Let it Die.
- In the Mementos section of Persona 5 Royal, modeled in part off the Tokyo subway system, points earned from stamps can be turned in to Jose in exchange for improved drop rates and experience gain rate-ups.
- The Edomae Elf anime portrayed a stamp rally that occurred simultaneously with the broadcasting of the anime, including a rendering of the real-world stamp book.

== See also ==
- Eki stamp
- Rallying
- Seal (East Asia)
- Shuin
- Shikoku Pilgrimage
- Seichi Junrei
- Passport stamp
- Rail transport in Japan
- Roadside station
