= Kathleen Lewis =

Kathleen Lewis may refer to:

- Kathleen McCree Lewis, American lawyer
- Kathleen Lewis (chemist), environmental chemist

== See also ==
- Kathy Lewis, American artist
