= Eki stamp =

Collectible stamp at Japanese train stations

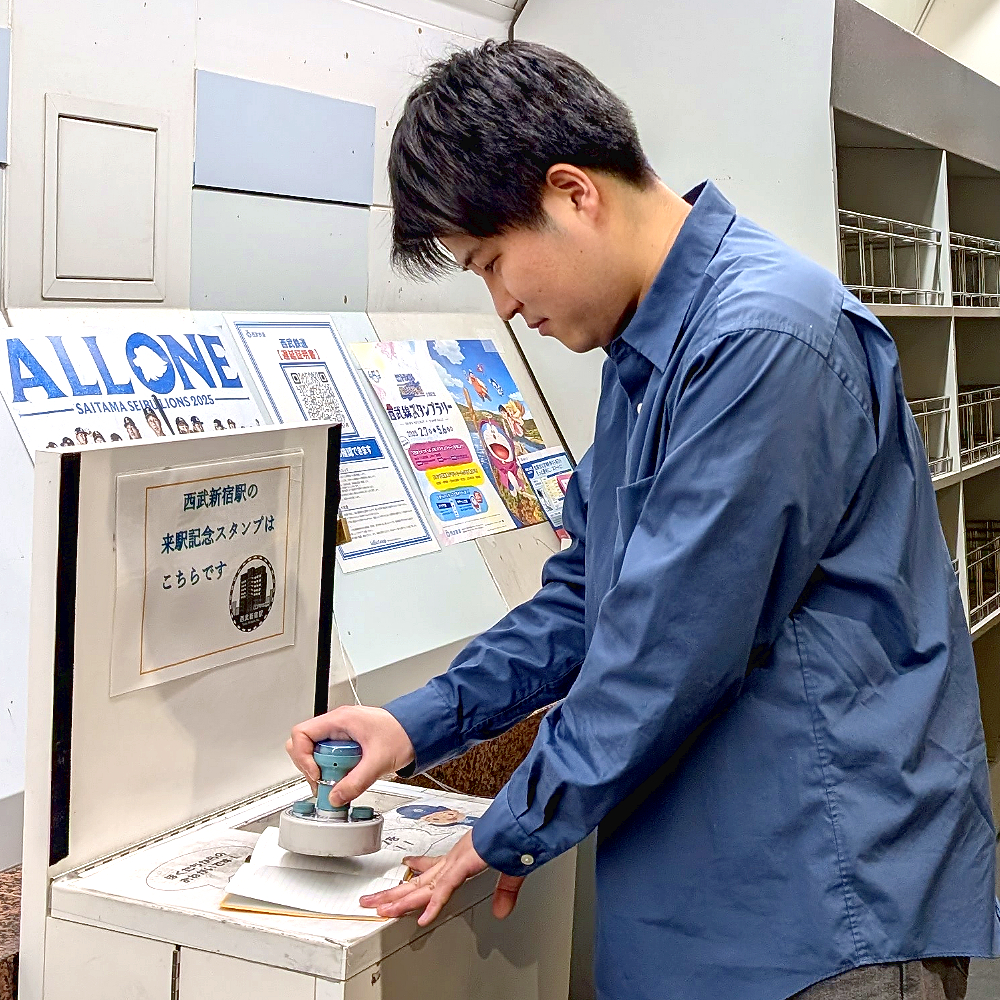
Man stamping an eki stamp at Seibu-Shinjuku Station

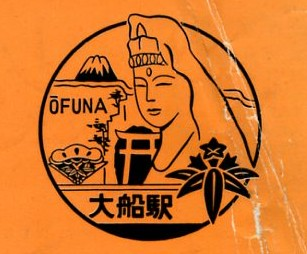
Eki stamp from Ōfuna Station, 1958

An eki stamp (駅スタンプ, eki sutanpu; "station stamp") is a free, collectible, rubber ink stamp found at many train stations in Japan. Their designs typically feature imagery emblematic of the station's associated city or surrounding area, such as landmarks, mascots, or locally produced goods. A time-limited event involving stamps pertaining to a specific theme – especially a collaboration with Japanese popular culture brands or characters – is called a stamp rally.

Some suggest eki stamps were inspired by the success of shuinchō stamp books. Eki stamps have existed since at least 1931, the first having been installed at a station in Fukui City. Shortly thereafter, eki stamps were installed at major stations throughout Japan. In recent years, eki stamps have also spread outside to Japan to places such as Taiwan and Indonesia.

Travelers may use their own notebooks or stamp books to collect these stamps, making it a pleasant way to document their journey. Today, eki stamps exist at a majority of (typically staffed) train stations and many subway stations in Japan. While not technically eki stamps (as eki in Japanese means "[train] station"), similar stamps can also be found at other passenger points of boarding, such as airports, ports, visitor information and tourist centers, roadside stations ("michi no eki"), and highway service areas.

Digital eki stamp application was introduced in Japan in 2022. As part of the 150th anniversary celebration of Japanese railways, the JR Group launched a web application enabling users to collect digital stamps using GPS location data. In March 2023, JR East Marketing & Communications launched Ekitag, a smartphone application which allows users to collect digital stamps by scanning NFC tags located in the stations.

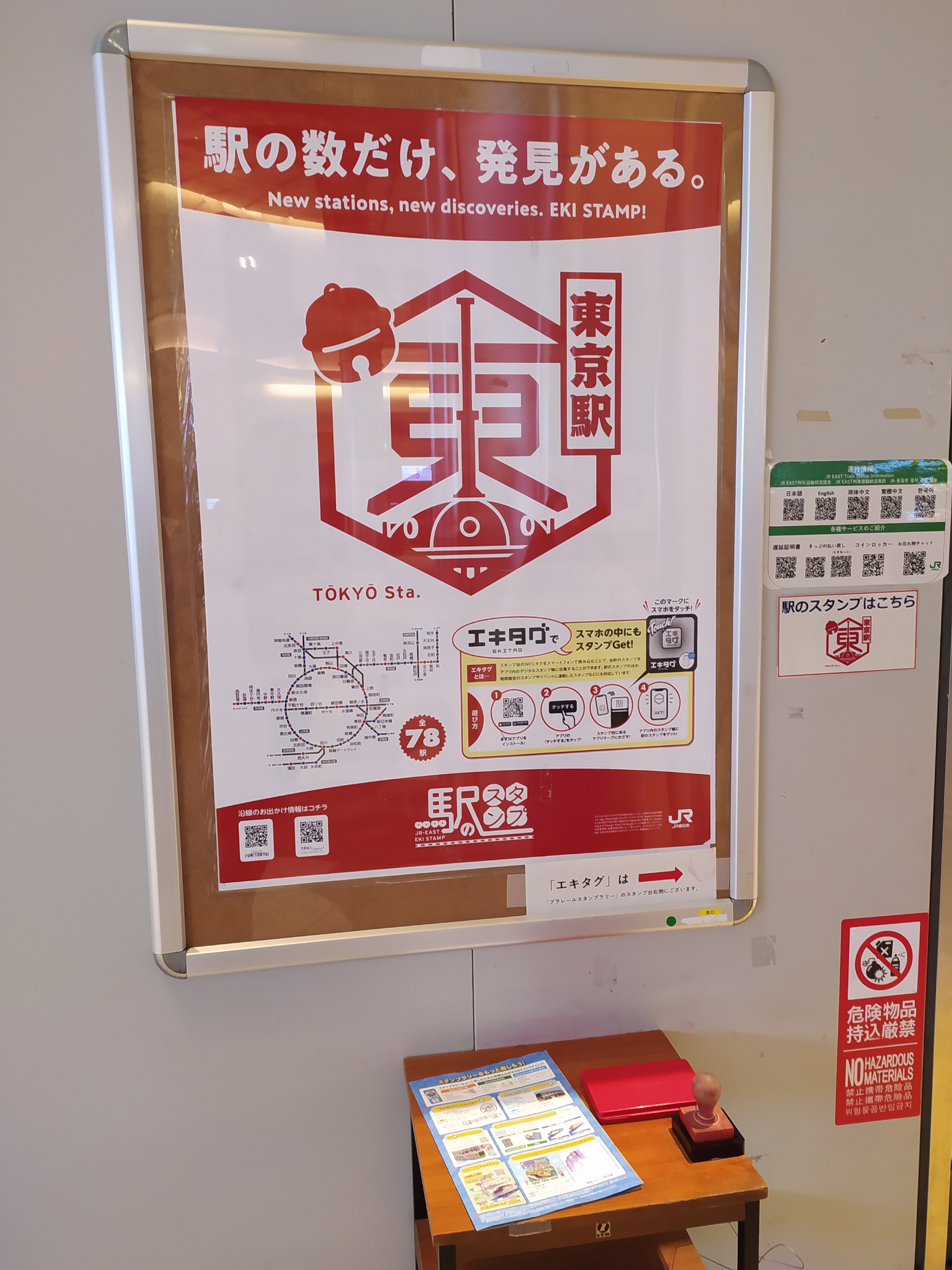
JR Tōkyō Station stamp stand

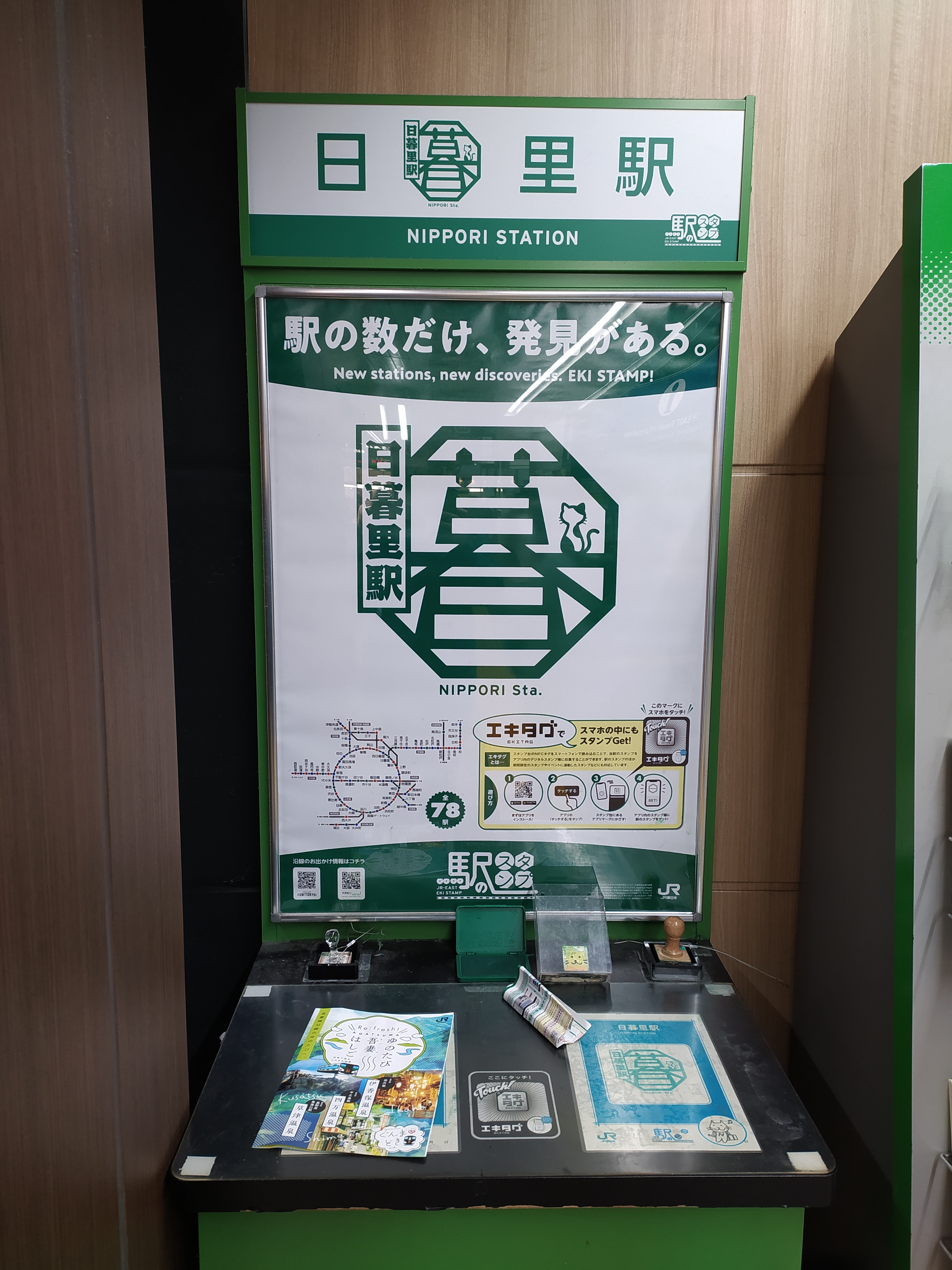
JR Nippori Station stamp stand

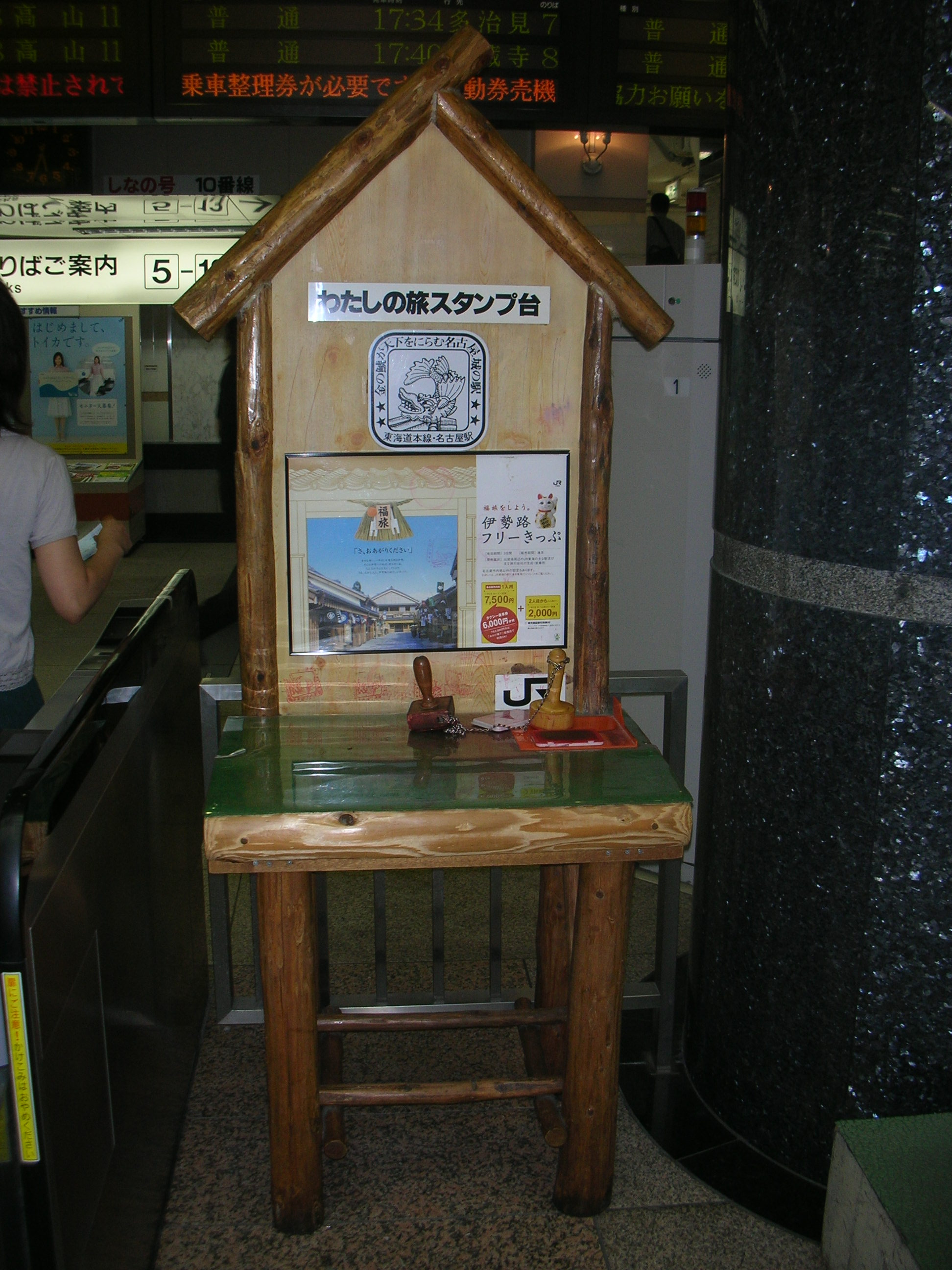
Former stamp stand at JR Nagoya Station

== See also ==
- Rubber stamp
- Passport stamp
- Hanko
- Shuin
