= Kathy Lewis =

American artist

Kathy Lewis is an artist living in Southern California, who received recognition with rubber stamps, and her collection of over 15,000 stamps. Additionally, Lewis was a math teacher at Cal State Fullerton, a mother of 3, and taught stamp classes at Stampa Barbara.
