= Eastern National =

- Formation: 1948
- Type: Nonprofit organization
- Tax ID no.: 23-1401703
- Services: Bookstores
- Website: easternnational.org

Eastern National (also known as EN) is a nonprofit Cooperating Association based in Fort Washington, Pennsylvania, that partners with the National Park Service in the United States. It was created by charter in 1948 to "provide quality educational products and services to the visitors to America's national parks and other public trusts." As of June 16, 2009, Eastern National has donated over $100 million to their partners.

== History ==
In 1947, some park service rangers formed the Eastern National Park & Monument Association at Gettysburg National Military Park. These rangers collected $147 and published one work: Abraham Lincoln in His Own Work and That of His Contemporaries. This book was sold at Abraham Lincoln Birthplace National Historic Site. The organization was officially chartered the following year.

== Bookstores ==
Eastern National operates interpretive bookstores in over 150 National Park units. EN publishes approximately 100 new products for the National Park Service each year. They also operate the Jamestown Glasshouse in Jamestown, Virginia, and partner with other agencies such as the Army Corps of Engineers and the United States Forest Service. eParks.com is the official online store of America's national parks, and is operated by Eastern National. Founded in 1947, EN provides critical funding and support for educational and interpretive programs in America's national parks and other public trusts.

== Passport stamps ==
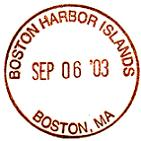
A passport stamp

They began the national park passport stamp program in 1986, and as of February 1, 2006 have sold 1.3 million passport books. To commemorate the 20th anniversary of the program, they created the "Passport Explorer", a new version of the passport book with larger, sturdier pages, in early 2006. The passport program has developed a following, including the creation of the non-profit National Park Travelers Club.
