= Cardmaking =

Hobby craft

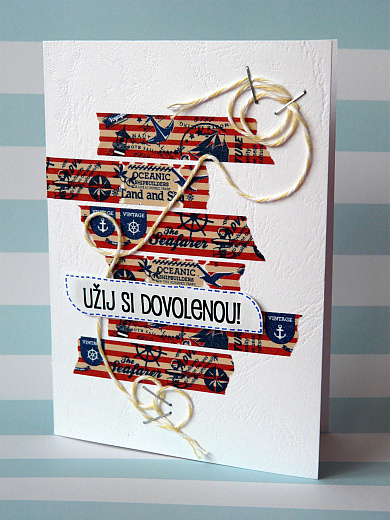
Hand made greeting card

Card making is the craft of hand-making greeting cards. It shares skills in common in allied crafts such as scrapbooking and stamping.

Unlike handcrafted cards, mass-produced printed greeting cards have been faced with competition from electronic greeting cards. Over seven billion greeting cards were sent in the US each year; greeting cards are a multibillion-dollar business.

Many hobbyists taking advantage of the low setup costs of web-based selling and the wide customer-base of auction sites like eBay to market their cards. Many others continue to sell their creations at craft fairs, markets and fêtes. Others use their cardmaking skills to turn a profit in the wedding planning market making handmade wedding invitations and favors.

There are many different variations of handmade cards including decoupage, more commonly known as 3D, where a design is printed a number of times, then various areas of the design are cut and layered on top of each other using double-sided sticky foam squares to mount the layers together to create the 3D effect making a very attractive greeting card.

== History ==
The custom of sending greeting cards can be traced back to the ancient Chinese, who exchanged messages of good will to celebrate the New Year, and to the early Egyptians, who conveyed their greetings on papyrus scrolls.

By the early 15th century, handmade paper greeting cards were being exchanged in Europe. The Germans are known to have printed New Year's greetings from woodcuts as early as 1400, and handmade paper Valentines were being exchanged in various parts of Europe in the early to mid-15th century.

By the 1850s, however, the greeting card had been transformed from a relatively expensive, handmade and hand-delivered gift to a popular and affordable means of personal communication, due largely to advances in printing and mechanization.

This trend continued, followed by new trends like Christmas cards, the first of which appeared in published form in London in 1843 when Sir Henry Cole hired artist John Callcott Horsley to design a holiday card that he could send to his friends and acquaintances. Technical developments like color lithography in 1930 propelled the manufactured greeting card industry forward.

During the 1980s, the trend began to turn, with consumers increasing looking for greeting cards that were differentiated from the standard offering. In the late 1990s, e-cards made their way into the market. This included the use of digital media and composition software to produce cards for physical printing, opening up cardmaking to those without artistic abilities.

== Materials ==
Common cardmaking materials include: cardstock, stencils, markers, vellum, tissue paper, glue, rulers and t-squares, rickrack, foil, sequins, beads, ribbon, acetate, paper embossing, die cutting machines and more. Other materials that can be used in cardmaking are brads, eyelets, tea bag medallions, and buttons. Brads can be used to hold the four corners of one piece of cardstock on top of another to create a layered effect. Eyelets can be used to draw a piece of string or ribbon from one side of the card to another. Tea bag medallions are a type of origami that makes a wonderful decoration for the front of a card. Pretty shaped buttons make nice additions to a design. Other ways of decorating cards include using rubber or polymer stamps to add images or sentiments to the card which can then be coloured or decorated using a wide variety of paint or ink techniques.
