= National Park Travelers Club =

National Park Travelers Club (NPTC)
- Founded: 2004
- Type: Non-profit social club
- Location: United States
- Members: over 3000
- Website: http://www.parkstamps.org

The National Park Travelers Club (or NPTC) is a non-profit 501(c)7 social club organization. Its mission is to provide networking and recognition opportunities for visitors to America's National Park System. This Club acts to support and expand appreciation of the U.S. National Park System.

== Description ==
The NPTC was organized in 2004, at the second meeting of a small group of National Park enthusiasts. Since then, it has grown to over 3000 dues paying members (dues are $10 for the first year, and $5 per year after that), and over 18000 members of the free online site. Paying dues gives members access to the Master List, Master Database, and Master Map of all known National Park Passport Stamp locations, in addition to voting in club elections. The online site features trip reports and hints for visits to parks, information on legislation impacting parks, and a message board for park related topics. The membership meets yearly at the NPTC Annual Convention and also arranges smaller group meetings at events such as park dedications or important park anniversaries. Additionally, awards are given out to members meeting visitation criteria, such as visiting certain numbers of park units within a year, or over a lifetime. The NPTC publishes a quarterly newsletter called The Stamp Pad.

== Conventions ==
The NPTC has hosted 20 annual conventions at various National Park Units. These meetings serve as an opportunity for club members to socialize, share trip stories, hear keynote presentations from National Park Service Rangers, and take group guided tours of the area. Attendance at the meeting is open to the public. A special official national park passport stamp is produced for each convention, and only available during the convention.

- 2003: Delaware Water Gap National Recreation Area
- 2004: Rocky Mountain National Park, the NPTC was formally chartered at this convention
- 2005: Mammoth Cave National Park
- 2006: Sleeping Bear Dunes National Lakeshore
- 2007: Olympic National Park
- 2008: Lowell National Historical Park
- 2009: Sequoia National Park
- 2010: El Malpais National Monument
- 2011: National Mall
- 2012: Apostle Islands National Lakeshore
- 2013: Shiloh National Military Park
- 2014: Klondike Gold Rush National Historical Park
- 2015: Chamizal National Memorial
- 2016: Independence National Historical Park
- 2017: Mount Rushmore National Memorial
- 2018: New Bedford Whaling National Historical Park
- 2019: Flagstaff, Arizona area national monuments (Wupatki National Monument, Sunset Crater, Walnut Canyon National Monument)
- 2020: Virtual meeting via Zoom due to the COVID-19 pandemic
- 2021: Mary McLeod Bethune Council House National Historic Site & Carter G. Woodson Home National Historic Site (Washington DC)
- 2022: Gateway Arch National Park & Ulysses S. Grant National Historic Site (St. Louis, MO)
- 2023: Carl Sandburg Home National Historic Site (Hendersonville, NC)
- 2024: Fort Vancouver National Historic Site (Vancouver, WA)
- 2025: Hot Springs National Park (Hot Springs, AR)
- 2026: Thomas Stone National Historic Site (Waldorf, MD)

== Awards ==
The NPTC awards travelers for lifetime achievement, as well as for annual visitation of the parks.

=== Lifetime Achievement Awards ===
- Bronze: visiting 100 park units
- Silver: visiting 200 park units
- Gold: visiting 300 park units
- Titanium: visiting 400 park units
- Platinum: visiting all 433 current National Park System units

=== Annual Master Traveler Awards ===
- Special Achievement: collecting 20 national park passport stamps from 10 park units in 2 geographic regions
- Clean Sweep: visiting a park unit in each of the 9 geographic regions within a year
- Bronze: collecting 50 stamps from 25 units in 4 geographic regions within a year
- Silver: collecting 75 stamps from 35 units in 5 geographic regions within a year
- Gold: collecting 100 stamps from 50 units in 6 geographic regions within a year

=== Other awards ===
- Most Wanted (formerly "Ten Most Wanted"): for finding a park passport stamp that has been exceptionally difficult to locate
- Surprise Park (discontinued after 2012): for visiting a park selected each year by the President of the club for having an anniversary of historical importance
- Civil War 150th Anniversary (discontinued after 2015): for visiting a Civil War related site and collecting its stamp on the anniversary of an event which happened exactly 150 years ago.

== Recognition ==
In addition to the articles referenced below, the club has been recognized by various organizations, including:

- Amtrak
- Eastern National
- National Park Service
