= Stampa Barbara =

Coordinates: 34.41798°N 119.69850°W

Stampa Barbara was a store in Santa Barbara, California that focused exclusively on rubber stamps. Opened in 1985, by Gary Dorothy, the store was the first of its kind. The store created their own designs, as well as selling several other companies' stamps. Stampa Barbara opened a second location in 1992 on Melrose, in Los Angeles. Gary Dorothy closed the store and sold his remaining inventory to Clearsnap in 1999, but continued to make and sell stamps online.
