= Kathleen Lewis (chemist) =

Chemist

Kathleen "Kathy" Lewis is an environmental chemist and professor of agricultural chemistry at University of Hertfordshire known for her work on environmental management, especially in the realm of pollution from chemicals.

== Education and career ==
Lewis earned a Ph.D. from the University of Hertfordshire in 1999. She was awarded the title of Professor in 2014 and, as of 2022, she is a professor at the University of Hertfordshire.

== Academic work ==
Lewis is known for her research in agriculture, especially on the evaluation and management of the environmental impact of agriculture. Her early work developed metrics to quantify the impact of agriculture and pesticides on the environment, and applied these tools to agricultural activities in the United Kingdom. She developed a tool to track agricultural issues known as Environmental Management for Agriculture (EMA), which was distributed on CDs and has been retired. Her subsequent work is as the scientific lead for the on-line Pesticide Properties Database (PPDB). The PPDB provides chemical and environmental information on pesticides and, as of 2011, holds data on over 1800 chemical compounds. In a 2017 expansion of the database, Lewis provided a means to track how pesticides dissipate in the environment.

== Selected publications ==
- Skinner, J. A.; Lewis, K. A.; Bardon, K. S.; Tucker, P.; Catt, J. A.; Chambers, B. J. (1 June 1997). "An Overview of the Environmental Impact of Agriculture in the U.K.". Journal of Environmental Management. 50 (2): 111–128. doi:10.1006/jema.1996.0103. ISSN 0301-4797.
- Lewis, K. A.; Bardon, K. S. (1 April 1998). "A computer-based informal environmental management system for agriculture". Environmental Modelling & Software. 13 (2): 123–137. doi:10.1016/S1364-8152(98)00010-3. hdl:2299/9179. ISSN 1364-8152.
- Tzilivakis, J.; Warner, D. J.; May, M.; Lewis, K. A.; Jaggard, K. (1 August 2005). "An assessment of the energy inputs and greenhouse gas emissions in sugar beet (Beta vulgaris) production in the UK". Agricultural Systems. 85 (2): 101–119. Bibcode:2005AgSys..85..101T. doi:10.1016/j.agsy.2004.07.015. ISSN 0308-521X.
- Tzilivakis, John; Green, Andrew; Warner, Doug; McGeevor, Kate; Lewis, Kathy (2012-01-01). "A framework for practical and effective eco-labelling of food products". Sustainability Accounting, Management and Policy Journal. 3 (1): 50–73. Bibcode:2012SAMP....3...50T. doi:10.1108/20408021211223552. hdl:2299/10466. ISSN 2040-8021.
  - won the 2013 Outstanding Paper Award Winner at the Literati Network Awards for Excellence.
- Lewis, Kathleen A.; Tzilivakis, John; Warner, Douglas J.; Green, Andrew (18 May 2016). "An international database for pesticide risk assessments and management". Human and Ecological Risk Assessment. 22 (4): 1050–1064. Bibcode:2016HERA...22.1050L. doi:10.1080/10807039.2015.1133242. hdl:2299/17565. ISSN 1080-7039. S2CID 87599872.
- Lewis, Kathy (2018). Agri-environmental Management in Europe : Sustainable Challenges and Solutions - From Policy Interventions to Practical Farm Management. John Tzilivakis, Doug Warner, Andy Green. Portland: 5m Publishing. ISBN 978-1-912178-46-9. OCLC 1032713790.

== Awards and honors ==
She is a Fellow of the Institution of Analysts and Programmers.
