= Passport to Your National Parks =

Souvenir program at U.S. National Parks

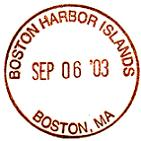
Example of a National Park Passport Stamp for the Boston Harbor Islands National Recreation Area

Passport to Your National Parks is a program through which ink stamps can be acquired at no cost at park visitor centers and ranger stations at nearly all of the 434 units of the United States National Park System and most of the National Park Service's affiliated areas. The program is run by Eastern National, a non-profit organization that operates bookstores in many park locations.

The ink stamps applied with a rubber stamp are similar in nature to passport stamps stamped in a traveler's national passport and serve as a record of each park visit. Eastern National has described the stamps as cancellations, but this is incorrect as a cancellation is a mark that cancels the validity of a postage stamp, while these mark a record of visitation like a passport stamp and denote a place and date like a postmark and do not cancel anything. Collectors of the stamps have formed a non-profit social club, the National Park Travelers Club, a group which holds annual conventions.

== Passport Books ==
Passport books are official guidebooks published as part of the Passport to Your National Parks program and provide designated spaces for visitors to collect ink cancellation stamps from units of the National Park Service. They are sold at park bookstores and online.

Classic Edition

The Classic Edition is the original passport book format. It is a compact (4"x6"), spiral-bound booklet containing 112 pages organized by regional sections with space to collect ink cancellation stamps and park details. It has been the core edition of the passport series since its introduction in 1986.

Collector’s Edition

The Collector’s Edition is a larger version of the passport book (7.5"x10") designed to accommodate stamp cancellations for over 400 National Park Service sites. It is 192 pages and spiral bound, featuring color-coded regional pages, additional space for official park cancellations, and regional maps.

Explorer Edition

First released in 2006 for the program’s twentieth anniversary, the Explorer Edition uses a 8"x11" 7-ring binder format with larger, rearrangeable pages, allowing visitors to add pages and organize stamp entries flexibly. This edition is suited for travelers planning extensive park visits or who desire space for memorabilia and additional content.

Junior Ranger Edition

The Junior Ranger Edition, developed in collaboration with the National Park Service, is aimed at younger visitors and combines traditional passport stamping with educational content and activities. This passport book is a 9"x7" soft cover, spiral bound booklet. It includes space for both standard park cancellation stamps and specially designed Junior Ranger cancellations, encouraging participation in Junior Ranger programs. The National Park Service and Eastern National announced this edition in 2018.

Passport to the American Revolution (America250)

In 2025, a special edition titled Passport to the American Revolution was released to commemorate the United States’ 250th anniversary. This passport book is a 4.5"x6.5" spiral bound book. This edition highlights national park sites associated with the American Revolution and includes designated areas for America250™ cancellation stamps alongside traditional passport stamps, as well as historical timelines and interpretive content. The book also contains a foreword from Ken Burns.

== National Park Passport Regions ==
The nine passport regions; the Washington metropolitan area is its own region.

The National Park Service is administratively divided into regions. Each region provides oversight and guidance to the park units within its geographic area. While the NPS currently divides the various parks, monuments, and other units among seven regions, the passport booklet organizes parks into the nine regions in effect when the program was established.

== Annual Stamp Series ==
In addition to the stamps, each year the Passport to Your National Parks program releases a set of ten full-color collector sticker stamps featuring a photo and description of one park per region. Passport holders can affix these adhesive stamps to their Passport book in a designated space below which they can stamp the corresponding ink stamp. The Park units featured on the stamp sets change each year.

The stamp sets, dating back to their inception in 1986, are still readily available at most park gift shops for under $10, or on the internet through Eastern National.

Originally, the featured stamps were only available in the region they represented, save for Colonial National Historical Park, where Eastern National was headquartered. In 1986 the stamps were printed on thin cardboard, which distorted the passbook due to the combined thickness of the cardboard. Each stamp would be mounted onto its respective page with a lightweight, black, adhesive-backed plastic sleeve. Since 1987, the annual stamp series have been printed on a single sheet of adhesive-backed glossy paper, of a quality similar to that of conventional postage stamps.

=== Featured stamps ===
| Year | National Stamp | Regional Stamps |
|---|---|---|
| 1986 | Statue of Liberty | Cape Cod National Seashore (North Atlantic); Colonial National Historical Park (Mid-Atlantic); Vietnam Veterans Memorial (National Capital); Blue Ridge Parkway (Southeast); Jefferson National Expansion Memorial (Midwest); Big Bend National Park (Southwest); Mount Rushmore National Memorial (Rocky Mountain); Yosemite National Park (Western); Mount Rainier National Park (Pacific Northwest & Alaska) |
| 1987 | Independence National Historical Park/Independence Hall | Acadia National Park (North Atlantic); Hopewell Furnace National Historic Site (Mid-Atlantic); Constitution Gardens (National Capital); Vicksburg National Military Park (Southeast); Lincoln Home National Historic Site (Midwest); White Sands National Park (Southwest); Devils Tower National Monument (Rocky Mountain); Hawaii Volcanoes National Park (West); Denali National Park and Preserve (Pacific Northwest & Alaska) |
| 1988 | The five winners of the Arts for the Parks contest: Cape Hatteras National Seashore; Yellowstone National Park; Lincoln Memorial; Canyon de Chelly National Monument; Glacier National Park | Salem Maritime National Historic Site (North Atlantic); Gettysburg National Military Park (Mid-Atlantic); The White House (National Capital); Natchez Trace Parkway (Southeast); Pictured Rocks National Lakeshore (Midwest); San Antonio Missions National Historical Park (Southwest); Bryce Canyon National Park (Rocky Mountain); Grand Canyon National Park (West); Olympic National Park (Pacific Northwest and Alaska) |
| 1989 | Yellowstone National Park | Federal Hall National Memorial (North Atlantic); Assateague Island National Seashore (Mid-Atlantic); Jefferson Memorial (National Capital); Great Smoky Mountains National Park (Southeast); Apostle Islands National Lakeshore (Midwest); Hot Springs National Park (Southwest); Arches National Park (Rocky Mountain); Great Basin National Park (West); Crater Lake National Park (Pacific Northwest & Alaska) |
| 1990 | Sequoia National Park | Ellis Island National Monument (North Atlantic); Appomattox Court House National Historical Park (Mid-Atlantic); Rock Creek Park (National Capital); Chickamauga and Chattanooga National Military Park (Southeast); Sleeping Bear Dunes National Lakeshore (Midwest); Pecos National Historical Park (Southwest); Rocky Mountain National Park (Rocky Mountain); Death Valley National Park (West); Craters of the Moon National Monument (Pacific Northwest and Alaska) |
| 1991 | Muir Woods National Monument | Lowell National Historical Park (North Atlantic); Valley Forge National Historical Park (Mid-Atlantic); Washington Monument (National Capital); Mammoth Cave National Park (Southeast); Indiana Dunes National Lakeshore (Midwest); Bandelier National Monument (Southwest); Fort Union Trading Post National Historic Site (Rocky Mountain); USS Arizona Memorial (West); Klondike Gold Rush National Historical Park (Pacific Northwest and Alaska) |
| 1992 | San Juan National Historic Site | Roger Williams National Memorial (North Atlantic); Edison National Historic Site (Mid-Atlantic); Frederick Douglass National Historic Site (National Capital); Castillo de San Marcos National Monument (Southeast); Fort Scott National Historic Site (Midwest); Salinas Pueblo Missions National Monument (Southwest); Big Hole National Battlefield (Rocky Mountain); Cabrillo National Monument (West); Fort Clatsop National Memorial (Pacific Northwest & Alaska) |
| 1993 | Grand Teton National Park | Boston National Historical Park (North Atlantic); Fort McHenry National Monument and Historic Site (Mid-Atlantic); Ford's Theatre National Historic Site (National Capital); Wright Brothers National Memorial (Southeast); Saint Croix National Scenic Riverway (Midwest); Arkansas Post National Memorial (Southeast); Hovenweep National Monument (Rocky Mountain); Redwood National Park (West); North Cascades National Park (Pacific Northwest and Alaska) |
| 1994 | Golden Spike National Historic Site | Martin Van Buren National Historic Site (North Atlantic); Allegheny Portage Railroad National Historic Site (Mid-Atlantic); Vietnam Veterans Memorial (National Capital); Carl Sandburg Home National Historic Site (Southeast); Harry S Truman National Historic Site (Midwest); Lyndon B. Johnson National Historical Park (Southwest); Florissant Fossil Beds National Monument (Rocky Mountain); Organ Pipe Cactus National Monument (West); Kenai Fjords National Park (Pacific Northwest and Alaska) |
| 1995 | Glacier National Park | Saint-Gaudens National Historic Site (North Atlantic); Delaware Water Gap National Recreation Area (Mid-Atlantic); Lincoln Memorial (National Capital); Andersonville National Historic Site (Southeast); Agate Fossil Beds National Monument (Midwest); Carlsbad Caverns National Park (Southwest); Rainbow Bridge National Monument (Rocky Mountain); Fort Point National Historic Site (West); Wrangell-St. Elias National Park and Preserve (Pacific Northwest and Alaska) |
| 1996 | Mesa Verde National Park | Saugus Iron Works National Historic Site (North Atlantic); Shenandoah National Park (Mid-Atlantic); Oxon Cove Park and Oxon Hill Farm (National Capital); Gulf Islands National Seashore (Southeast); Effigy Mounds National Monument (Midwest); El Morro National Monument (Southwest); Little Bighorn Battlefield National Monument (Rocky Mountain); National Park of American Samoa (West); John Day Fossil Beds National Monument (Pacific Northwest and Alaska) |
| 1997 | Everglades National Park | General Grant National Memorial (North Atlantic); New River Gorge National River (Mid-Atlantic); Korean War Veterans Memorial (National Capital); Dry Tortugas National Park (Southeast); Scotts Bluff National Monument (Midwest); Guadalupe Mountains National Park (Southwest); Zion National Park (Rocky Mountain); Pu'uhonua o Honaunau National Historical Park (West); Katmai National Park and Preserve (Pacific Northwest and Alaska) |
| 1998 | Women's Rights National Historical Park | Sagamore Hill National Historic Site (North Atlantic); Upper Delaware Scenic and Recreational River (Mid-Atlantic); Franklin Delano Roosevelt Memorial (National Capital); Fort Sumter National Monument (Southeast); Hopewell Culture National Historical Park (Midwest); Petroglyph National Monument (Southwest); Natural Bridges National Monument (Rocky Mountain); Point Reyes National Seashore (West); Sitka National Historical Park (Pacific Northwest and Alaska) |
| 1999 | Mount Rainier National Park; Bonus Stamp - Commemorative Issue: U.S. Department of the Interior. | Fire Island National Seashore (North Atlantic); Harpers Ferry National Historical Park (Mid-Atlantic); Fort Washington Park (National Capital); Cumberland Island National Seashore (Southeast); Herbert Hoover National Historic Site (Midwest); Jean Lafitte National Historical Park and Preserve (Southwest); Badlands National Park (Rocky Mountain); Joshua Tree National Park (West); Fort Vancouver National Historic Site (Pacific Northwest and Alaska) |
| 2000 | Minute Man National Historical Park | Weir Farm National Historic Site (North Atlantic); Manassas National Battlefield Park (Mid-Atlantic); National Mall (National Capital); Canaveral National Seashore (Southeast); Cuyahoga Valley National Park (Midwest); Chaco Culture National Historical Park (Southwest); Curecanti National Recreation Area (Rocky Mountain); Channel Islands National Park (West); Glacier Bay National Park and Preserve (Pacific Northwest and Alaska) |
| 2001 | Independence National Historical Park - The Liberty Bell | Theodore Roosevelt Inaugural National Historic Site (North Atlantic); Petersburg National Battlefield (Mid-Atlantic); Kenilworth Park and Aquatic Gardens (National Capital); Moores Creek National Battlefield (Southeast); Isle Royale National Park (Midwest); Fort Smith National Historic Site (Southwest); Canyonlands National Park (Rocky Mountain); Montezuma Castle National Monument (West); San Juan Island National Historical Park (Pacific Northwest and Alaska) |
| 2002 | Glen Canyon National Recreation Area | Saratoga National Historical Park (North Atlantic); Fredericksburg and Spotsylvania National Military Park (Mid-Atlantic); Theodore Roosevelt Island Park (National Capital); Stones River National Battlefield (Southeast); Grand Portage National Monument (Midwest); Buffalo National River (Southwest); Great Sand Dunes National Monument and Preserve (Rocky Mountain); Coronado National Memorial (West); Aniakchak National Monument and Preserve (Pacific Northwest and Alaska) |
| 2003 | Saguaro National Park | Vanderbilt Mansion National Historic Site (North Atlantic); Morristown National Historical Park (Mid-Atlantic); Mary McLeod Bethune Council House National Historic Site (National Capital); Fort Donelson National Battlefield (Southeast); Voyageurs National Park (Midwest); Gila Cliff Dwellings National Monument (Southwest); Wind Cave National Park (Rocky Mountain); Manzanar National Historic Site (West); City of Rocks National Reserve (Pacific Northwest and Alaska) |
| 2004 | Navajo National Monument | Frederick Law Olmsted National Historic Site (North Atlantic); Fort Necessity National Battlefield (Mid-Atlantic); Pennsylvania Avenue National Historic Site (National Capital); Big South Fork National River and Recreation Area (Southeast); Fort Larned National Historic Site (Midwest); Fort Union National Monument (Southwest); Colorado National Monument (Rocky Mountain); Chiricahua National Monument (West); Lake Roosevelt National Recreation Area (Pacific Northwest and Alaska) |
| 2005 | George Washington Memorial Parkway | Boston African American National Historic Site (North Atlantic); Antietam National Battlefield (Mid-Atlantic); World War II Memorial (National Capital); Cumberland Gap National Historical Park (Southeast); Wilson's Creek National Battlefield (Midwest); Aztec Ruins National Monument (Southwest); Bent's Old Fort National Historic Site (Rocky Mountain); Lassen Volcanic National Park (West); Whitman Mission National Historic Site (Pacific Northwest and Alaska) |
| 2006 | Petrified Forest National Park | New Bedford Whaling National Historical Park (North Atlantic); Booker T. Washington National Monument (Mid-Atlantic); West Potomac Park (National Capital); Obed Wild and Scenic River (Southeast); Tallgrass Prairie National Preserve (Midwest); Pea Ridge National Military Park (Southwest); Grant-Kohrs Ranch National Historic Site (Rocky Mountain); Tonto National Monument (West); Gates of the Arctic National Park and Preserve (Pacific Northwest and Alaska) |
| 2007 | Kalaupapa National Historical Park | Springfield Armory National Historic Site (North Atlantic); Catoctin Mountain Park (Mid-Atlantic); George Mason Memorial (National Capital); Fort Pulaski National Monument (Southeast); Homestead National Monument of America (Midwest); Amistad National Recreation Area (Southwest); Cedar Breaks National Monument (Rocky Mountain); Mojave National Preserve (West); Ebey's Landing National Historical Reserve (Pacific Northwest & Alaska) |
| 2008 | Pinnacles National Park | Theodore Roosevelt Birthplace National Historic Site (North Atlantic); Chesapeake and Ohio Canal National Historical Park (Mid-Atlantic); Meridian Hill Park (National Capital); Andrew Johnson National Historic Site (Southeast); Ozark National Scenic Riverways (Midwest); Cane River Creole National Historical Park (Southwest); Jewel Cave National Monument (Rocky Mountain); Tumacacori National Historical Park (West); Lake Chelan National Recreation Area (Pacific Northwest & Alaska) |
| 2009 | Abraham Lincoln Birthplace National Historic Site | Gateway National Recreation Area (North Atlantic); Richmond National Battlefield Park (Mid-Atlantic); District of Columbia War Memorial (National Capital); Congaree National Park (Southeast); Lincoln Boyhood National Memorial (Midwest); Padre Island National Seashore (Southwest); Fort Laramie National Historic Site (Rocky Mountain); Haleakala National Park (West); Oregon Caves National Monument (Pacific Northwest & Alaska) |
| 2010 | Dinosaur National Monument | Fort Stanwix National Monument (North Atlantic); George Washington Birthplace National Monument (Mid-Atlantic); Piscataway Park (National Capital); Fort Matanzas National Monument (Southeast); Perry's Victory and International Peace Memorial (Midwest); Washita Battlefield National Historic Site (Southwest); Capitol Reef National Park (Rocky Mountain); Kings Canyon National Park (West); Lewis and Clark National Historical Park (Pacific Northwest & Alaska) |
| 2011 | Fort Sumter National Monument in honor of the 150th anniversary of the Civil War | Adams National Historic Park (North Atlantic); Prince William Forest Park (Mid-Atlantic); Ulysses S. Grant Memorial (National Capital); Fort Frederica National Monument (Southeast); Niobrara National Scenic River (Midwest); Fort Davis National Historic Site (Southwest); Theodore Roosevelt National Park (Rocky Mountain); Devils Postpile National Monument (West); Ross Lake National Recreation Area (Pacific Northwest & Alaska) |
| 2012 | Shiloh National Military Park in honor of the 150th anniversary of the Civil War | Hamilton Grange National Memorial (North Atlantic); Clara Barton National Historic Site (Mid-Atlantic); John Ericsson National Memorial (National Capital); Natchez National Historical Park (Southeast); Pipestone National Monument (Midwest); El Malpais National Monument (Southwest); Black Canyon of the Gunnison National Park (Rocky Mountain); Fort Bowie National Historic Site (West); Noatak National Preserve (Pacific Northwest & Alaska); Girl Scouts of the USA (Special stamp commemorating its 100th anniversary) |
| 2013 | Martin Luther King, Jr. Memorial | Longfellow House-Washington's Headquarters National Historic Site (North Atlantic); Paterson Great Falls National Historical Park (Mid-Atlantic); George Gordon Meade Memorial (National Capital); De Soto National Memorial (Southeast); River Raisin National Battlefield Park (Midwest); Little Rock Central High School National Historic Site (Southwest); John D. Rockefeller, Jr. Memorial Parkway (Rocky Mountain); Sunset Crater Volcano National Monument (West); Lake Clark National Park and Preserve (Pacific Northwest & Alaska); "I Have A Dream" (Special stamp commemorating the 50th anniversary of March on Washington for Jobs and Freedom, which took place August 28, 1963) |
| 2014 | Fort McHenry National Monument and Historic Shrine | Marsh-Billings-Rockefeller National Historical Park (North Atlantic); Johnstown Flood National Memorial (Mid-Atlantic); Lyndon Baines Johnson Memorial Grove on the Potomac (National Capital); Horseshoe Bend National Military Park (Southeast); Dayton Aviation Heritage National Historical Park (Midwest); Big Thicket National Preserve (Southwest); Bighorn Canyon National Recreation Area (Rocky Mountain); César E. Chávez National Monument (West); Bering Land Bridge National Preserve (Pacific Northwest & Alaska) |
| 2015 | Appomattox Court House National Historical Park | Boston Harbor Islands National Recreation Area (North Atlantic); Monocacy National Battlefield (Mid-Atlantic); Ford's Theatre National Historic Site (National Capital); Ocmulgee National Monument (Southeast); Missouri National Recreational River (Midwest); Lake Meredith National Recreation Area (Southwest); Fossil Butte National Monument (Rocky Mountain); Walnut Canyon National Monument (West); Nez Perce National Historical Park (Pacific Northwest & Alaska) |
| 2016 | National Park Service Turns 100 | Acadia National Park (North Atlantic); Wolf Trap National Park for the Performing Arts (Mid-Atlantic); John Paul Jones Memorial (National Capital); Abraham Lincoln National Historical Park (Southeast); George Rogers Clark National Historical Park (Midwest); Capulin Volcano National Monument (Southwest); Fort Union Trading Post National Historic Site (Rocky Mountain); Hawai'i Volcanoes National Park (West); San Juan Island National Historical Park (Pacific Northwest & Alaska) |
| 2017 | Denali National Park and Preserve | John Fitzgerald Kennedy National Historic Site (North Atlantic); Eisenhower National Historic Site (Mid-Atlantic); Belmont-Paul Women's Equality National Monument (National Capital); Guilford Courthouse National Military Park (Southeast); George Washington Carver National Monument (Midwest); Palo Alto Battlefield National Historical Park (Southwest); Sand Creek Massacre National Historic Site (Rocky Mountain); Casa Grande Ruins National Monument (West); Yukon–Charley Rivers National Preserve (Pacific Northwest & Alaska) |
| 2018 | Appalachian National Scenic Trail | Eleanor Roosevelt National Historic Site (North Atlantic); Steamtown National Historic Site (Mid-Atlantic); Vietnam Women's Memorial (National Capital); Biscayne National Park (Southeast); James A. Garfield National Historic Site (Midwest); Valles Caldera National Preserve (Southwest); Minuteman Missile National Historic Site (Rocky Mountain); Hubbell Trading Post National Historic Site (West); Minidoka National Historic Site (Pacific Northwest & Alaska); Wild and Scenic Rivers (Special stamp commemorating the 50th anniversary of the National Wild and Scenic Rivers System) |
| 2019 | Grand Canyon National Park | Home of Franklin D. Roosevelt National Historic Site (North Atlantic); Fort Monroe National Monument (Mid-Atlantic); President's Park (National Capital); Cape Hatteras National Seashore (Southeast); William Howard Taft National Historic Site (Midwest); New Orleans Jazz National Historical Park (Southwest); Yucca House National Monument (Rocky Mountain); San Francisco Maritime National Historical Park (West); Hagerman Fossil Beds National Monument (Pacific Northwest & Alaska) |
| 2020 | Women’s Rights National Historical Park | Stonewall National Monument (North Atlantic); Maggie L. Walker National Historic Site (Mid-Atlantic); Potomac Heritage National Scenic Trail (National Capital); Jimmy Carter National Historic Site (Southeast); First Ladies National Historic Site (Midwest); Waco Mammoth National Monument (Southwest); Knife River Indian Villages National Historic Site (Rocky Mountain); Rosie the Riveter World War II Home Front National Historical Park (West); Alagnak Wild River (Pacific Northwest & Alaska) |
| 2021 | Golden Gate National Recreation Area | Castle Clinton National Monument (North Atlantic); Flight 93 National Memorial (Mid-Atlantic); Dwight D. Eisenhower Memorial (National Capital); Virgin Islands Coral Reef National Monument (Southeast); Nicodemus National Historic Site (Midwest); Chamizal National Memorial (Southwest); Timpanogos Cave National Monument (Rocky Mountain); Pu'ukohola Heiau National Historic Site (West); Kobuk Valley National Park (Pacific Northwest & Alaska) |
| 2022 | Lake Mead National Recreation Area | Governors Island National Monument (North Atlantic); Thaddeus Kościuszko National Memorial (Mid-Atlantic); Carter G. Woodson Home National Historic Site (National Capital); Cape Lookout National Seashore (Southeast); Pullman National Monument (Midwest); Chickasaw National Recreation Area (Southwest); Yellowstone National Park (Rocky Mountain); Great Basin National Park (West); Cape Krusenstern National Monument (Pacific Northwest & Alaska) |
| 2023 | Manhattan Project National Historical Park | Minute Man National Historical Park (North Atlantic); First State National Historical Park (Mid-Atlantic); Mary McLeod Bethune Council House National Historic Site (National Capital); Kennesaw Mountain National Battlefield Park (Southeast); Charles Young Buffalo Soldiers National Monument (Midwest); President William Jefferson Clinton Birthplace Home National Historic Site (Southwest); Bryce Canyon National Park (Rocky Mountain); Pipe Spring National Monument (West); Olympic National Park (Pacific Northwest & Alaska) |
| 2024 | Boston National Historical Park | Ellis Island (North Atlantic); Harriet Tubman Underground Railroad National Historical Park (Mid-Atlantic); World War II Memorial (National Capital); Tuskegee Airmen National Historic Site (Southeast); Ulysses S. Grant National Historic Site (Midwest); Rio Grande Wild and Scenic River (Southwest); Grand Teton National Park (Rocky Mountain); Wupatki National Monument (West); Craters of the Moon National Monument and Preserve (Pacific Northwest & Alaska) |
| 2025 | Mount Rushmore National Memorial | African Burial Ground National Monument (North Atlantic); Friendship Hill National Historic Site (Mid-Atlantic); Old Stone House (National Capital); Christiansted National Historic Site (Southeast); Brown v. Board of Education National Historical Park (Midwest); Alibates Flint Quarries National Monument (Southwest); Golden Spike National Historical Park (Rocky Mountain); John Muir National Historic Site (West); John Day Fossil Beds National Monument (Pacific Northwest & Alaska) |
| 2026 | Zion National Park; Bonus Stamp - 250th Anniversary of The United States of America | Blackstone River Valley National Historical Park (North Atlantic); Arlington House, The Robert E. Lee Memorial (Mid-Atlantic); World War I Memorial (National Capital); Big Cypress National Preserve (Southeast); Ste. Geneviève National Historical Park (Midwest); Blackwell School National Historic Site (Southwest); Glacier National Park (Rocky Mountain); Tuzigoot National Monument (West); Crater Lake National Park (Pacific Northwest & Alaska) |
| 2027 | Stones River National Battlefield | Statue of Liberty National Monument (North Atlantic); Thomas Stone National Historic Site (Mid-Atlantic); Anacostia Park (National Capital); Little River Canyon National Preserve (Southeast); Keweenaw National Historical Park (Midwest); Poverty Point National Monument (Southwest); Dinosaur National Monument (Rocky Mountain); Santa Monica Mountains National Recreation Area (West); Wrangell-St. Elias National Park (Pacific Northwest & Alaska) |
