= Manhole cards =

Japanese collectible cards featuring manhole covers

Manhole cards (Japanese: マンホールカード, manhōru kādo) are collectible cards featuring decorated manhole covers. They are produced by the Sewerage Public Relations Platform (GKP) and local authorities in Japan. Each card shows a cover and explains its design. The cards are distributed free of charge as part of a campaign to increase interest in sewerage. The scheme also aims to attract visitors to the places featured on the cards. Distribution began in April 2016. Collectors obtain the cards by visiting the places where they are issued.

== History ==
The cards were devised by Hideto Yamada, who worked as a sewerage publicist. His childhood interest in collecting cards and stickers helped shape the project. Another model was the dam card, a collectible card with a photograph and information about a dam.

Yamada presented the cards at the Manhole Summit in Tokyo on 19 March 2016. Sample cards were handed out to attendees. The first series was released on 1 April 2016, with 30 cards from 28 local authorities.

In September 2019, Oricon News reported that more than four million cards had been issued. A GKP representative told the publication that demand had increased around the third series in December 2016, when some places exhausted their supplies on the first day.

The nineteenth series, released in April 2023, included the first overseas edition, featuring a cover in Siem Reap, Cambodia. The Cambodian edition was issued under a memorandum of understanding between Japan's Ministry of Land, Infrastructure, Transport and Tourism and Cambodia's Ministry of Public Works and Transport.

By the twenty-ninth series in July 2026, GKP listed 1,311 card types from 783 local authorities and four other organisations.

== Design ==
The cards measure 63 mm (2.5 in) wide and 88 mm (3.5 in) high, the same size as standard trading cards. The front shows a photograph of a manhole cover, its location and its geographic coordinates. Pictograms identify subjects depicted on the cover. The back explains the design and includes related pictures, the year when covers of that design were first installed, and the place where the card is distributed. It also carries a drawing of the cover and a QR code linking to a website.

In a 2022 account of the project, Yamada explained that the format and numbering were intended to support collecting by region or theme as well as completing a full set. A single toy manufacturer handled printing to keep the paper and colours consistent across the series.

The background colours identify nine regional groups:

Regional colours
Region	Colour
Hokkaido	Dark green
Tōhoku	Light green
Kantō	Light blue
Hokuriku	Dark blue
Chūbu	Yellow
Kansai	Orange
Chūgoku	Red
Shikoku	Purple
Kyushu	Pink

The scheme groups Okinawa with Kyushu and Niigata with Hokuriku. There is also a nationwide colour category. Pictograms cover 32 categories of subjects shown in the designs.

Each card has four collection numbers: one for all cards in the scheme and one each for its region, prefecture and municipality. A separate design code combines the prefectural and municipal codes with a letter and number. Letters distinguish designs within a municipality. Different locations of covers with the same design receive different numbers. A production code on the back records the card's introduction month and year, revision number and printing lot.

== Distribution and collecting ==
Cards are given out at designated places, including municipal offices, sewerage facilities and tourist information centres. The distribution rule is one card per person, handed over in person; cards are not sent by post. Some local authorities also issue English editions, including Tsukuba, Yonago and Kitakyushu.

Collectors may seek cards from a particular area or cards whose pictograms share a theme. Architectural researcher Adriana Caldarone interprets card collecting, themed tourism and urban photography as practices that strengthen the cultural meaning of decorated manhole covers.

A study by Ayaka Ito and Yoshito Kikuchi received responses from 423 issuing organisations in 2022. Asked to identify the main effect of card distribution, 68.6% of 421 respondents chose increased visitor numbers. In a separate question with 421 responses, 34.9% identified resale as the main problem. These responses reflected the issuing organisations' own assessments. The authors also examined recipients' places of residence and concluded that most recipients in the areas studied lived outside the municipality where they collected their cards.

Despite being distributed free of charge, some cards have been resold through online auctions and flea-market services for tens of thousands of yen. In 2019, GKP told Oricon News that resale continued despite restrictions on distribution. GKP asks collectors to refrain from reselling the cards, which it intends as souvenirs and a way to encourage interest in sewerage.

== Series ==
New series are generally issued three times a year.

Series launch dates
Series	Distribution began
1	1 April 2016
2	1 August 2016
3	1 December 2016
4	3 April 2017
5	1 August 2017
6	9 December 2017
7	28 April 2018
8	11 August 2018
9	14 December 2018
10	7 August 2019
11	14 December 2019
12	29 April 2020
13	17 December 2020
14	25 April 2021
15	17 August 2021
16	15 January 2022
17	6 August 2022
18	28 January 2023
19	28 April 2023
20	28 July 2023
21	15 December 2023
22	26 April 2024
23	26 July 2024
24	20 December 2024
25	25 April 2025
26	25 July 2025
27	19 December 2025
28	24 April 2026
29	31 July 2026

== See also ==
- Decorative manhole covers
