= Shuin =

Japanese Shinto seal stamp

A shuin (朱印), also called Go-shuin (御朱印) as an honorific, is a seal stamp given to worshippers and visitors to Shinto shrines and Buddhist temples in Japan. The seal stamps are often collected in books called shuinchō (朱印帳) that are sold at shrines and temples.

The stamps are different from commemorative stamps in that they are made by people who work at the shrines or temples: Shinto Kannushi or Buddhist Hōshi. To create the shuin, the writer presses down one or more large stamps, and then uses black ink to write, in their distinctive calligraphy, the day of the visit, the name of the shrine or temple, as well as sometimes the names of the relevant Kami or Buddhist deities, and other messages.

There are various theories about the origin of shuin, though the strongest is that it was a receipt for a dedicated copied sutra. There are still temples where one cannot receive a shuin without having donated a sutra or money, but the majority of temples will now accept a small amount of money for a shuin. It usually costs 300 yen, though there are some places that charge up to 1000 yen.

As shuin are given at both Shinto shrines and Buddhist temples, there is some discussion as to whether stamps from both shrines and temples can be written in the same shuinchō. While ultimately a matter of personal preference, there are rare instances in which a shrine or temple may refuse to write a shuin if the shuinchō contains both Buddhist and Shinto stamps.

Special shuinchō (and occasionally hanging scrolls) are available for people who do pilgrimages such as the Kansai Kannon Pilgrimage and the Shikoku Pilgrimage. People who do the Shikoku Pilgrimage can also get shuin on the white robes they sometimes wear.

A number of Jōdo Shinshū temples do not offer shuin, in order to discourage the practice of visiting for the sake of only collecting shuin.

== Gallery ==
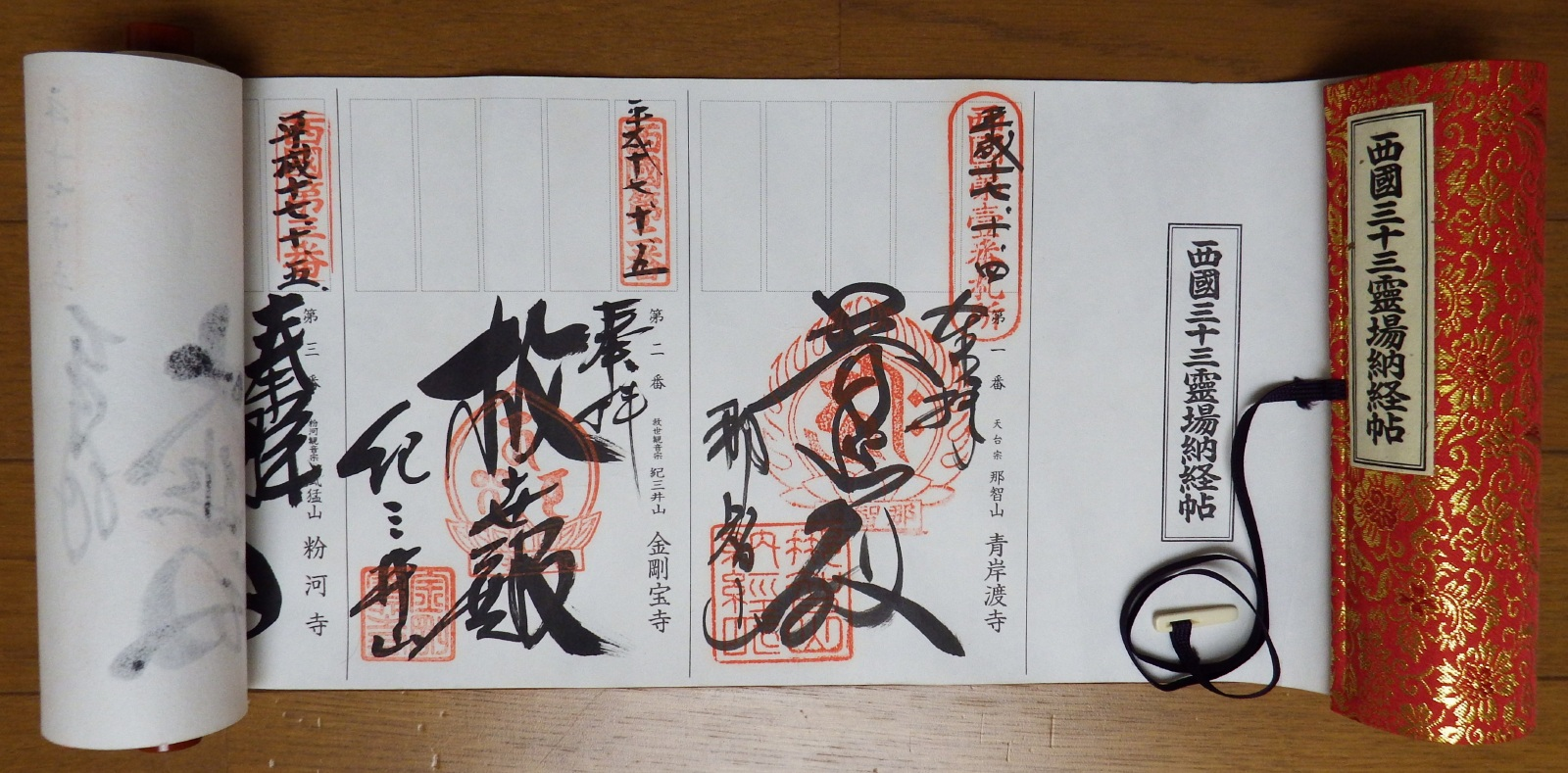
Shuinchō (朱印帳)

Shuin being made in Zentsū-ji, Kagawa

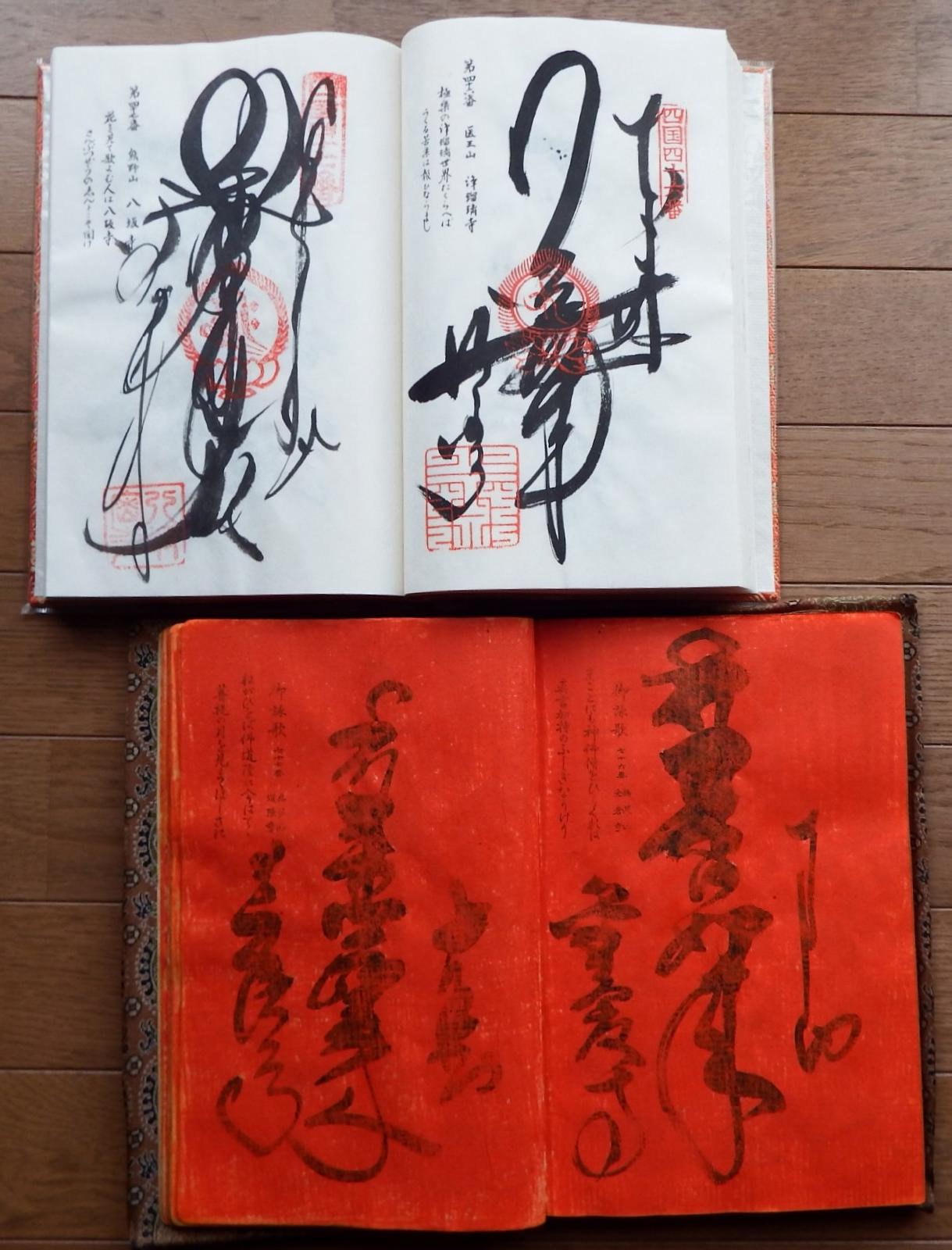
Kasane-in (重ね印)

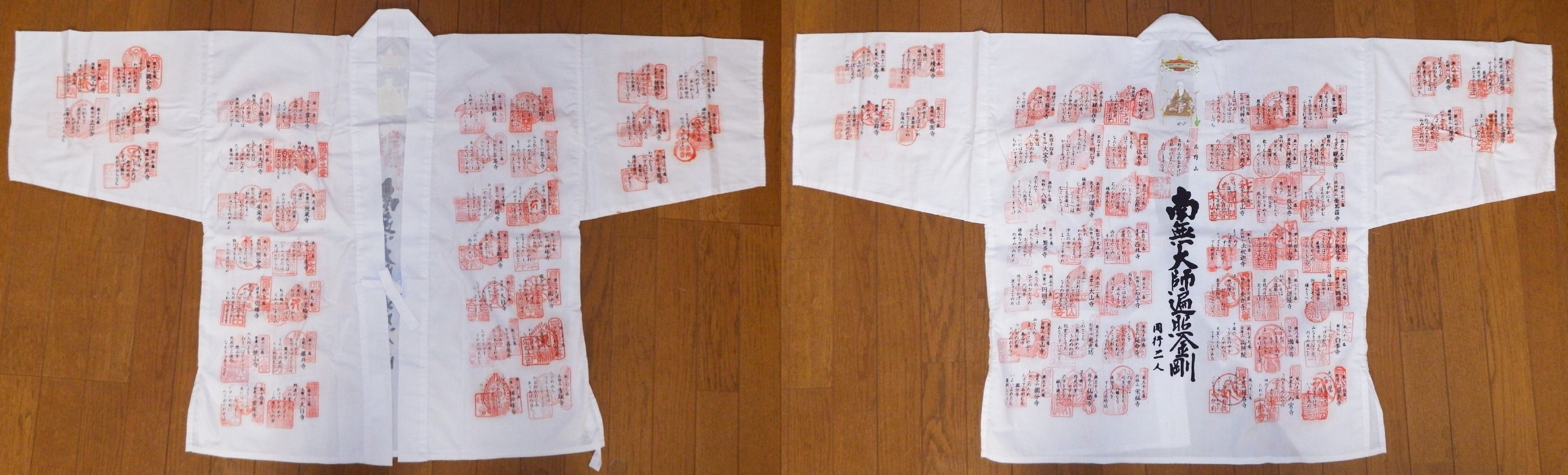
Byakue (白衣)

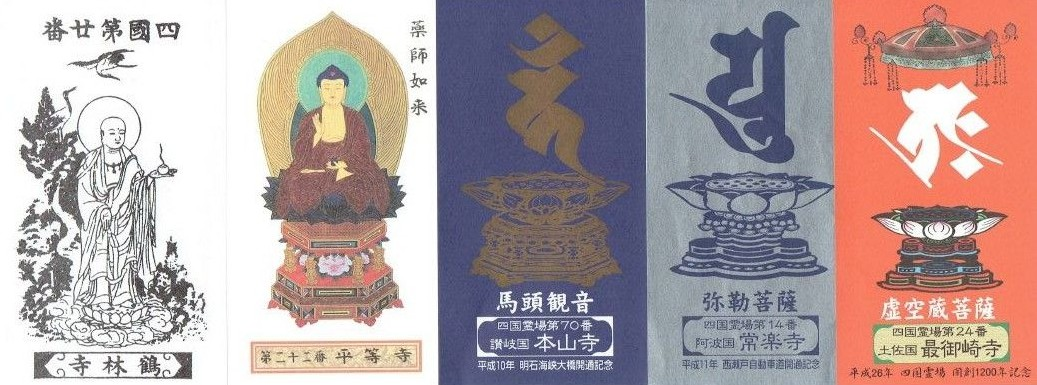
Miei (御影)

Sange (散華)

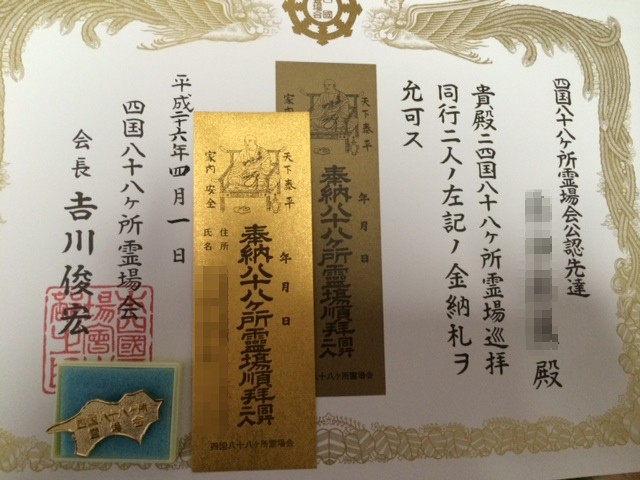
Mangan (満願の証)

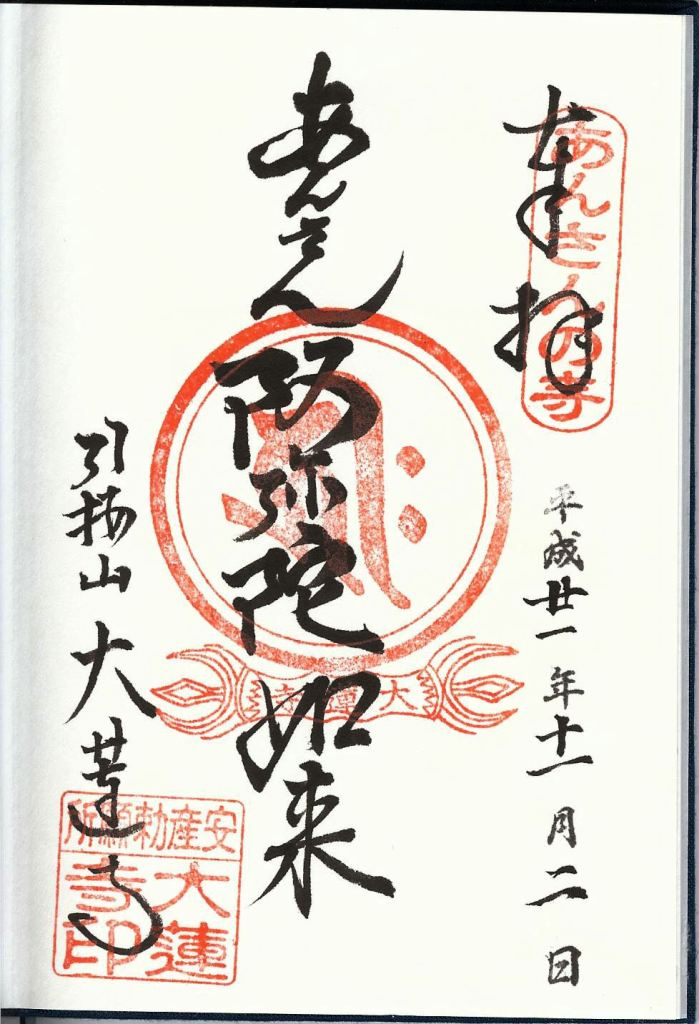
A shuin from Dairen-ji (大蓮寺)

Pilgrimage
