= Rubber stamp =

Small tool for over-printing

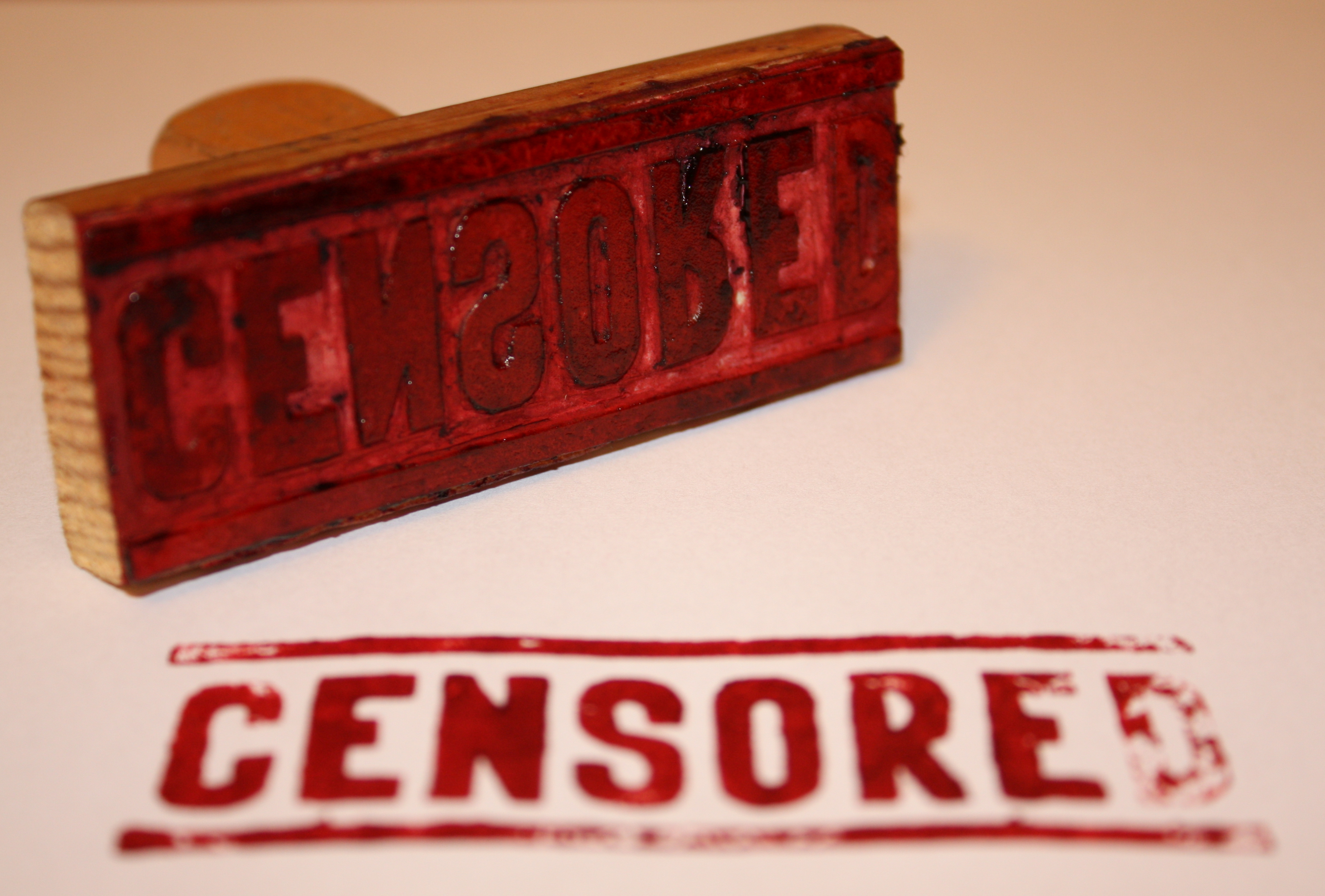
A rubber stamp, and the message stamped by it

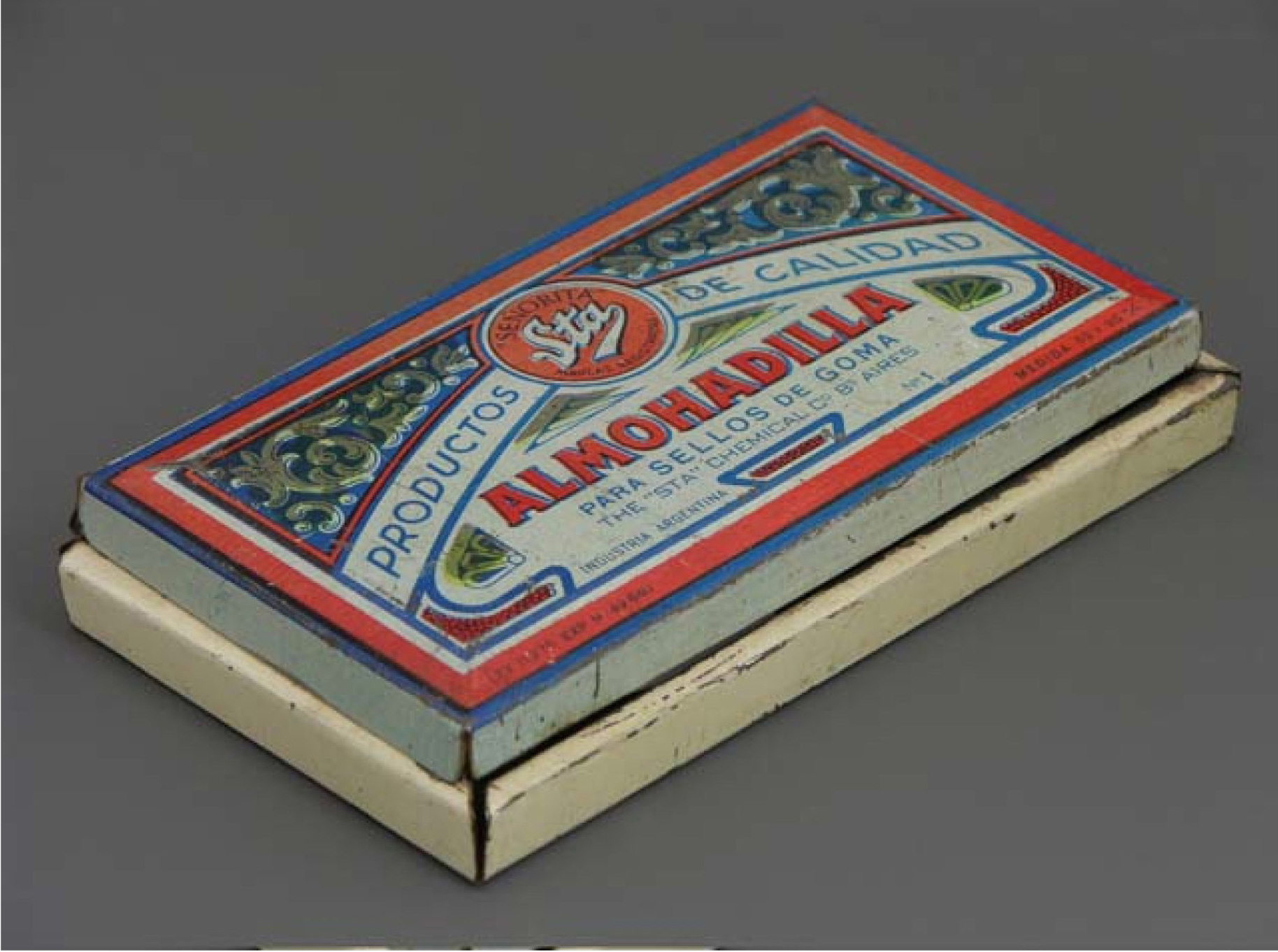
Ink pad from second half of the twentieth century, in the Museo del Objeto del Objeto collection

A rubber stamp is an image or pattern that has been carved, molded, laser engraved, or vulcanized onto a sheet of rubber. Rubber stamping, also called stamping, is a craft in which some type of ink made of dye or pigment is applied to a rubber stamp, and used to make decorative images on some media, such as paper or fabric.

== Description ==
A rubber stamp uses a raised-relief image molded into a sheet of rubber, often mounted onto a more stable object such as a wood, brick, or an acrylic block. For compactness, the vulcanized rubber image with an adhesive foam backing may be attached to a cling vinyl sheet which allows it to be used with an acrylic handle for support. These cling rubber stamps can be stored in a smaller amount of space, and typically cost less than the wood-mounted versions. They can also be positioned with a greater amount of accuracy due to the stamper's ability to see through the handle being used.

The ink-coated rubber stamp is pressed onto any type of medium such that the colored image is transferred to the medium. The medium is generally some type of fabric or paper. Other media used are wood, metal, glass, plastic, and rock. High-volume batik uses liquid wax instead of ink, with a metal stamp.

There are three main types of rubber stamp inking technology: traditional stamps with a separate ink pad, self-inking stamps with a self-contained die that flips to make an imprint, and pre-inked stamps where the die material is impregnated with ink.

Commercially available rubber stamps are marketed in three categories: stationery stamps for use in the office, stamps used for decorating objects, or those used as children's toys.

== Business rubber stamps ==
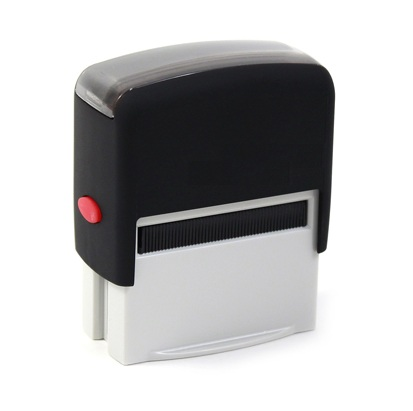
Self-inking stamp: the stamp normally rests against an internal ink pad, but pressing the assembly against a surface flips it over for printing.

Rubber stamps for business commonly show an address, corporate logo and business registration number. Some stamps also have movable parts that allow the user to adjust the date or the wording of the stamp. They are used to date incoming mail, as well as to denote special handling for documents. In some countries it is common practice for formal documents such as contracts to be rubber-stamped over the signature as additional evidence of authenticity. The objective is to authenticate the contracts, prevent forging, and increases efficiency as company executives do not have to separately sign individual company documents.

Business stamps are commonly obtained from stationery stores or directly from manufacturers. They encompass a variety of types, including address stamps, standard word stamps like "received" or "payment due," and dater stamps. These stamps collectively account for nearly 30% of annual sales in the industry.

== As an art form ==
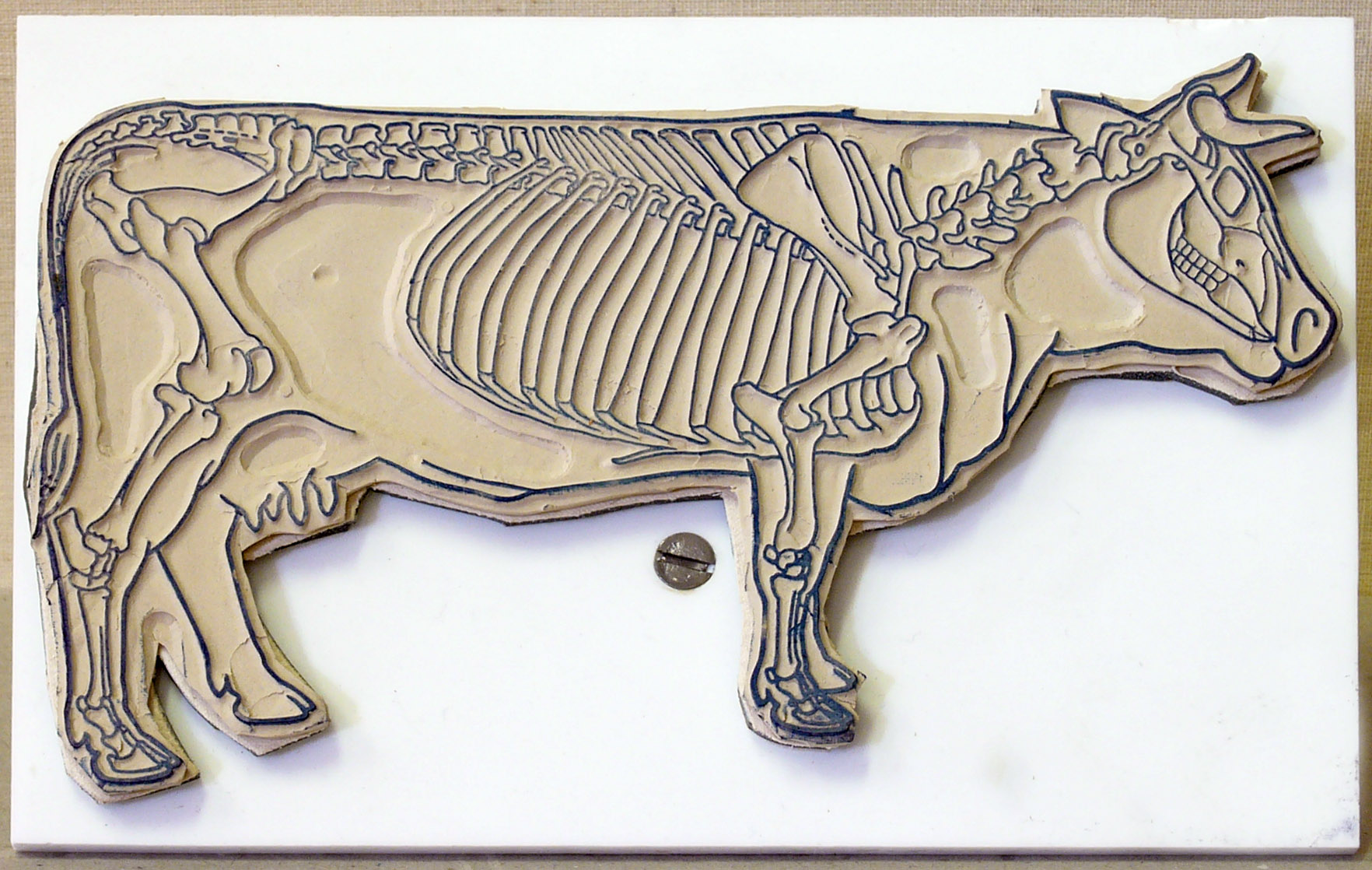
Contour stamp

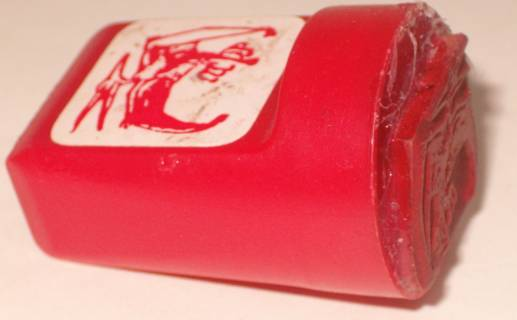
A toy rubber stamp featuring a pterosaur

Fabrication of stamp by photopolymer method

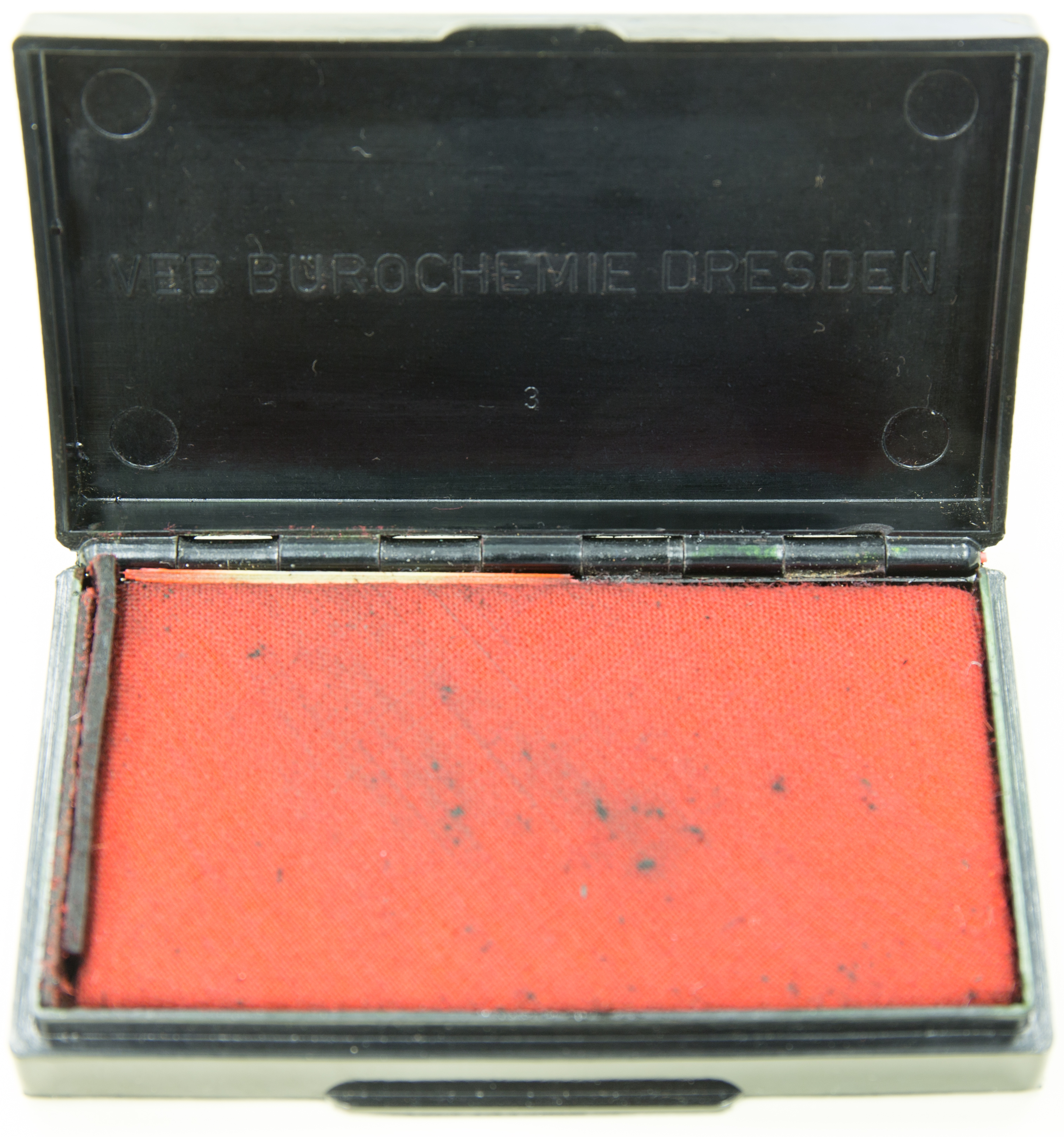
Ink pad "Barock Made in East Germany" (c.1960), in the collection of the Museum Europäischer Kulturen

Materials besides rubber can produce a stamp. Woodcut and linocut, the carving of linoleum, are art forms based on the same principles. Linoleum is a harder material than rubber and requires additional pressure to carve. Woodcut is used by experienced artists, requiring both talent and patience. Rubber carving materials are often similar to that of linoleum and woodcut, such as sharp cutting heads – V and U tools. Temporary stamps with simple designs can be carved from a potato or other semi-rigid food item.

Furthermore, photopolymer stamps are gaining popularity. They are most often produced in a set of coordinated images using a clear polymer material on an acetate carrier sheet for storage and packaging. The stamps are peeled from the carrier sheet and applied to a clear acrylic handle. This allows the stamper to view the image through the handle and effect precise placement of the image where desired. Photopolymer stamps are generally produced in the United States for sale domestically and internationally. Silicone stamps have many of the same properties of the photopolymer stamps. The creation of clear stamps facilitates the storage of a sizeable image collection, as they can all be used with a single set of handles of various sizes. They are also often very economical, being produced in sets of several images which work together to form a cohesive look.

Various methods can alter the appearance of carved stamps. Paints, pigments, and dye inks create different effects, extending the use of rubber stamping from paper to fabrics, wood, metal, glass, and so on. Ink pads can be purchased that allow for embossing, and there are markers that can be used to ink stamp pads with colors for a multi-color look. The use of rubber stamps can be combined with other materials. The image may be embellished by the addition of chalks, inks, paints, fibers, and a variety of other ephemera and embellishments.

Hand-carved rubber stamps find frequent use in mail art or artist trading cards, as they are typically small and allow the creation of a series of images. The TAM Rubber Stamp Archive has a collection of prints of rubber stamps mail-artists have used since 1983. Stamping is also often used in handmade cardmaking, scrapbooking, and letterboxing.

Rubber stamping as an art form started to develop in the 19th Century. The first rubber stamps were believed to be created after the discovery of vulcanized rubber by the American Charles Goodyear in 1839. Vulcanization allowed rubber to be permanently hardened, so it could be used for many commercial processes. It is believed that the first rubber stamps were created by James Orton Woodruff from Auburn, NY. His uncle, Urial Woodruff, was a dentist who used a vulcanizer to make rubber dentures. James realized he could use the technology to create rubber stamps, and he created the Superb Stamp Pad Co. The rubber stamp became popular in offices beginning in the 1870s in the United States and Britain.

During the Victorian age, government and business offices produced more and more official documents, and the rubber stamps used to make them official became more and more elaborate. The liberation of the rubber stamp from office buildings and into the world of art started with Kurt Schwitters, in his Stempelzeichunger (stamp drawings) as early as 1919.

In the late 1950s and early 1960s, rubber stamps started to show up in the artworks of figures like Joseph Beuys, George Brecht, Robert Filliou, Ken Friedman, Dick Higgins, Milan Knížák, Nam June Paik, Daniel Spoerri, Saul Steinberg, Timm Ulrichs, Wolf Vostell, Allan Kaprow and Emmett Williams. Andy Warhol started using rubber stamps in his marketing work in the 1950s, and he also played with using rubber stamps in some of his artworks. The stamps appealed to modern artists because they were everyday objects, easily reproducible, and could be used to create expressive or geometrical shapes. They blurred the boundaries between corporate culture, advertising, and fine art.

Rubber stamps started to show up in the modernist and post-modern works of the 1960s and 1970s. In the mid-1960s there were two main groups of artists using rubber stamps for art making: the Nouveau Realists and the Flux group. In the 1970s, the Parasol Press in New York City decided to print a series of affordable artist prints using rubber stamps. The collection included works by 13 artists working in the 1970s, and the 13 prints were sold for $100 per set. Rubber stamping continues to be used in contemporary works, most famously in the artwork of Stephen Fowler.

== Stamping communities ==
Stamping has become a very popular home-based craft, and there are a number of forums, some with many thousands of members. Craft stampers tend to be associated with other paper crafts, such as card making and scrapbooking.

Periodical publications for the stamping community have included Rubber Stamps and The Stampers' Sampler Magazine. The latter two periodicals appear to have stopped publishing.

== Other applications ==
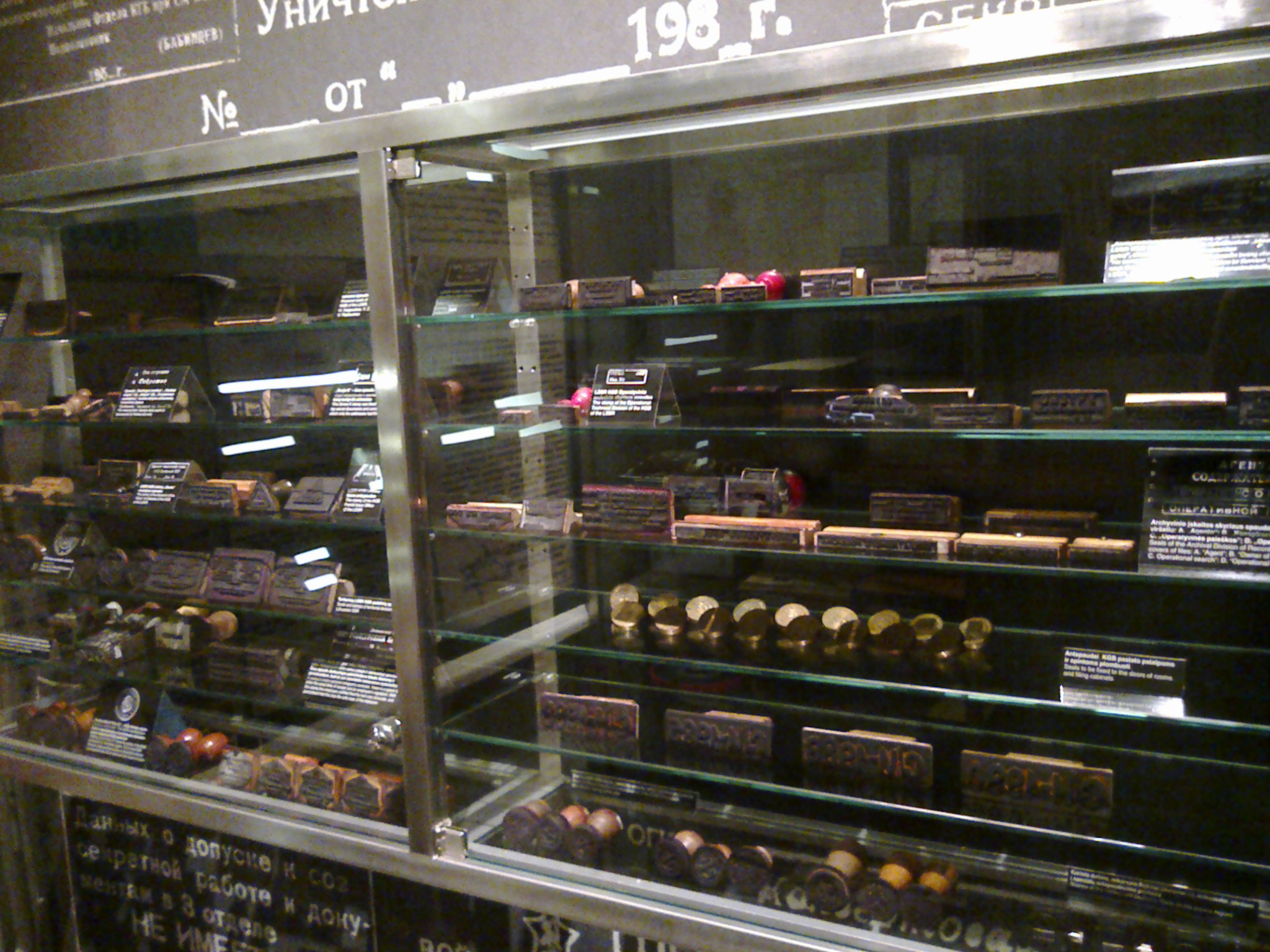
Bureaucratic rubber stamps displayed in the Museum of Occupations and Freedom Fights, in Vilnius, Lithuania

Rubber stamps enjoy many other uses. Applications range from education to marking animals to the food and drinks industry. A few are listed below:

- Passport stamps
- In the mail system: as postmarks, cancellations, and killers
- Personal seals in the Sinosphere (which use ink)
- Dietary requirements on food packaging
- Stamping food, e.g. meats (with food grade ink, e.g. Noris 111 meat marking ink)
- Animal marking, e.g. in pigeon racing
- As proof of a properly completed pilgrimage, e.g. the Camino de Santiago
- As souvenirs, e.g. Japanese eki stamps, the stamps of US national parks, those found in the Czech Republic and other countries
- Education (teacher) stamps
- Loyalty stamps, used to encourage repeat sales
- Textiles
- In Letterboxing

== Automated "rubber stamp" images ==
Document marking can be done from within the user's word processor. This can be done manually by creating the "stamps" to appear on the documents in automated document marking software for Microsoft Word. This allows each page to be stamped as it is printed with the user-selected images created electronically.

== See also ==
- Decal
- Embroidered patch
- Seal (device)
- Sticker
- Where's George? an American website that uses rubber stamp marked dollar bills to track the movement of that currency around the world
