= List of the United States National Park System official units =

The logo of the National Park Service

The Official Units of the National Park System of the United States is the collection of physical properties owned or administered by the National Park Service.

As of October 2026, there are 434 official units of the National Park System; however, this number can be misleading. For example, Denali National Park and Preserve are counted as two units, since the same name applies to a national park and an adjacent national preserve. Yet Jean Lafitte National Historical Park and Preserve is counted as one unit, despite its double designation. Counting methodology is rooted in the language of a park's enabling legislation. Furthermore, the NPS contributes resources to "affiliated areas" which do not fall under its administration, and these do not count toward the official list number. An example is Oklahoma City National Memorial.

These units are a subset of the areas in the United States National Park System, and nearly all participate in the national park passport stamps program. National Park System units are found in all 50 states, in the District of Columbia, and in the U.S. territories of Guam, American Samoa, the U.S. Virgin Islands, and Puerto Rico. (The territory of the Northern Mariana Islands has an affiliated area but not an official NPS unit.)

== Statistics ==
Type	Number
National Park (List of national parks of the United States)	64
National Monument (List of national monuments of the United States)	86
National Historical Park	64
National Historic Site	75
International Historic Site	1
National Battlefield Park	4
National Military Park	9
National Battlefield	11
National Battlefield Site	1
National Memorial (List of national memorials of the United States)	32
National Recreation Area	18
National Seashore (List of United States national lakeshores and seashores)	10
National Lakeshore (List of United States national lakeshores and seashores)	3
National River	4
National Wild and Scenic Rivers	10
National Preserve	19
National Reserve	2
National Parkway	4
National Trail	6
Other	11
Total	434

== Full list ==
Bold indicates National Parks. indicates World Heritage Sites, indicates Tentative List sites.

Name	Location
Birmingham Civil Rights National Monument	Alabama
Freedom Riders National Monument	Alabama
Horseshoe Bend National Military Park	Alabama
Little River Canyon National Preserve	Alabama
Russell Cave National Monument	Alabama
Tuskegee Airmen National Historic Site	Alabama
Tuskegee Institute National Historic Site	Alabama
Alagnak Wild River	Alaska
Aniakchak National Monument (Note: Operated as Aniakchak National Monument and Preserve.)	Alaska
Aniakchak National Preserve	Alaska
**Denali National Park** (Note: Operated as Denali National Park and Preserve.)	Alaska
Denali National Preserve	Alaska
**Gates of the Arctic National Park** (Note: Operated as Gates of the Arctic National Park and Preserve.)	Alaska
Gates of the Arctic National Preserve	Alaska
**Glacier Bay National Park** (Note: Operated as Glacier Bay National Park and Preserve.)	Alaska
Glacier Bay National Preserve	Alaska
**Katmai National Park** (Note: Operated as Katmai National Park and Preserve.)	Alaska
Katmai National Preserve	Alaska
**Kenai Fjords National Park**	Alaska
Klondike Gold Rush National Historical Park	Alaska
Klondike Gold Rush National Historical Park	Washington
**Lake Clark National Park** (Note: Operated as Lake Clark National Park and Preserve.)	Alaska
Lake Clark National Preserve	Alaska
Sitka National Historical Park	Alaska
Bering Land Bridge National Preserve (Note: Operated as Western Arctic National Parklands.)	Alaska
Cape Krusenstern National Monument	Alaska
**Kobuk Valley National Park**	Alaska
Noatak National Preserve	Alaska
**Wrangell-St. Elias National Park** (Note: Operated as Wrangell–St. Elias National Park and Preserve.)	Alaska
Wrangell-St. Elias National Preserve	Alaska
Yukon-Charley Rivers National Preserve	Alaska
**National Park of American Samoa**	American Samoa
Canyon De Chelly National Monument	Arizona
Casa Grande Ruins National Monument	Arizona
Hohokam Pima National Monument (Note: No visitor access. Administered by Casa Grande Ruins National Monument, another unit on this list.)	Arizona
**Chiricahua National Park**	Arizona
Coronado National Memorial	Arizona
Fort Bowie National Historic Site	Arizona
Glen Canyon National Recreation Area	Arizona
Glen Canyon National Recreation Area	Utah
**Grand Canyon National Park**	Arizona
Hubbell Trading Post National Historic Site	Arizona
Montezuma Castle National Monument	Arizona
Navajo National Monument	Arizona
Organ Pipe Cactus National Monument	Arizona
**Petrified Forest National Park**	Arizona
Pipe Spring National Monument	Arizona
**Saguaro National Park**	Arizona
Sunset Crater Volcano National Monument	Arizona
Tonto National Monument	Arizona
Tumacacori National Historical Park	Arizona
Tuzigoot National Monument	Arizona
Walnut Canyon National Monument	Arizona
Wupatki National Monument	Arizona
Arkansas Post National Memorial	Arkansas
Buffalo National River	Arkansas
Fort Smith National Historic Site	Arkansas
**Hot Springs National Park**	Arkansas
Little Rock Central High School National Historic Site	Arkansas
Pea Ridge National Military Park	Arkansas
President William Jefferson Clinton Birthplace Home National Historic Site	Arkansas
Cabrillo National Monument	California
Castle Mountains National Monument	California
César E. Chávez National Monument	California
**Channel Islands National Park**	California
**Death Valley National Park**	California
**Death Valley National Park**	Nevada
Devils Postpile National Monument	California
Eugene O'Neill National Historic Site	California
Golden Gate National Recreation Area	California
Fort Point National Historic Site (Note: Operated under Golden Gate National Recreation Area, another unit on this list.)	California
Muir Woods National Monument	California
John Muir National Historic Site	California
**Joshua Tree National Park**	California
**Lassen Volcanic National Park**	California
Lava Beds National Monument	California
Manzanar National Historic Site	California
Mojave National Preserve	California
**Pinnacles National Park**	California
Point Reyes National Seashore	California
Port Chicago Naval Magazine National Memorial (Note: Administered by John Muir National Historic Site, another unit on this list.)	California
**Redwood National Park**	California
Rosie the Riveter World War II Home Front National Historical Park	California
San Francisco Maritime National Historical Park	California
Santa Monica Mountains National Recreation Area	California
**Sequoia National Park** (Note: Operated as Sequoia and Kings Canyon National Parks.)	California
**Kings Canyon National Park**	California
Tule Lake National Monument	California
Whiskeytown-Shasta-Trinity National Recreation Area	California
**Yosemite National Park**	California
Amache National Historic Site	Colorado
Bent's Old Fort National Historic Site	Colorado
**Black Canyon of the Gunnison National Park**	Colorado
Colorado National Monument	Colorado
Curecanti National Recreation Area	Colorado
Dinosaur National Monument	Colorado
Dinosaur National Monument	Utah
Florissant Fossil Beds National Monument	Colorado
**Great Sand Dunes National Park** (Note: Operated as Great Sand Dunes National Park and Preserve.)	Colorado
Great Sand Dunes National Preserve	Colorado
Hovenweep National Monument	Colorado
Hovenweep National Monument	Utah
**Mesa Verde National Park**	Colorado
**Rocky Mountain National Park**	Colorado
Sand Creek Massacre National Historic Site	Colorado
Yucca House National Monument (Note: Administered by Mesa Verde National Park, another unit on this list.)	Colorado
Weir Farm National Historical Park	Connecticut
First State National Historical Park	Delaware
First State National Historical Park	Pennsylvania
National Capital Parks-East	District of Columbia
Carter G. Woodson Home National Historic Site (Note: Operated under National Capital Parks-East, another unit on this list.)	District of Columbia
Frederick Douglass National Historic Site	District of Columbia
Fort Washington Park	Maryland
Greenbelt Park	Maryland
Mary McLeod Bethune Council House National Historic Site	District of Columbia
Piscataway Park	Maryland
National Mall and Memorial Parks	District of Columbia
Belmont-Paul Women's Equality National Monument (Note: Operated under National Mall and Memorial Parks, another unit on this list.)	District of Columbia
Constitution Gardens	District of Columbia
Dwight D. Eisenhower Memorial	District of Columbia
Desert Shield and Desert Storm Memorial	District of Columbia
Ford's Theatre National Historic Site	District of Columbia
Franklin D. Roosevelt Memorial	District of Columbia
Korean War Veterans Memorial	District of Columbia
Lincoln Memorial	District of Columbia
Martin Luther King, Jr. Memorial	District of Columbia
Pennsylvania Avenue National Historic Site	District of Columbia
Thomas Jefferson Memorial	District of Columbia
Vietnam Veterans Memorial	District of Columbia
Washington Monument	District of Columbia
World War I Memorial	District of Columbia
World War II Memorial	District of Columbia
Rock Creek Park	District of Columbia
White House and President's Park	District of Columbia
Big Cypress National Preserve	Florida
**Biscayne National Park**	Florida
Canaveral National Seashore	Florida
Castillo de San Marcos National Monument	Florida
De Soto National Memorial	Florida
**Dry Tortugas National Park**	Florida
**Everglades National Park**	Florida
Fort Matanzas National Monument	Florida
Gulf Islands National Seashore	Florida
Gulf Islands National Seashore	Mississippi
Timucuan Ecological and Historic Preserve	Florida
Fort Caroline National Memorial (Note: Operated under Timucuan Ecological and Historic Preserve, another unit on this list.)	Florida
Andersonville National Historic Site	Georgia
Chattahoochee River National Recreation Area	Georgia
Chickamauga & Chattanooga National Military Park	Georgia
Chickamauga & Chattanooga National Military Park	Tennessee
Cumberland Island National Seashore	Georgia
Fort Frederica National Monument	Georgia
Fort Pulaski National Monument	Georgia
Jimmy Carter National Historical Park	Georgia
Kennesaw Mountain National Battlefield Park	Georgia
Martin Luther King Jr. National Historical Park	Georgia
Ocmulgee Mounds National Historical Park	Georgia
War in the Pacific National Historical Park	Guam
**Haleakala National Park**	Hawaii
**Hawaii Volcanoes National Park**	Hawaii
Honouliuli National Historic Site	Hawaii
Kalaupapa National Historical Park	Hawaii
Kaloko-Honokohau National Historical Park	Hawaii
Pearl Harbor National Memorial	Hawaii
Pu'uhonua O Honaunau National Historical Park	Hawaii
Pu'ukohola Heiau National Historic Site	Hawaii
City of Rocks National Reserve	Idaho
Craters of the Moon National Monument (Note: Operated as Craters of the Moon National Monument and Preserve.)	Idaho
Craters of the Moon National Preserve	Idaho
Hagerman Fossil Beds National Monument	Idaho
Minidoka National Historic Site	Idaho
Nez Perce National Historical Park	Idaho
Nez Perce National Historical Park	Montana
Nez Perce National Historical Park	Oregon
Nez Perce National Historical Park	Washington
Lincoln Home National Historic Site	Illinois
New Philadelphia National Historic Site (Note: Administered by Lincoln Home National Historic Site, another unit on this list.)	Illinois
Pullman National Historical Park	Illinois
Springfield 1908 Race Riot National Monument	Illinois
George Rogers Clark National Historical Park	Indiana
**Indiana Dunes National Park**	Indiana
Lincoln Boyhood National Memorial	Indiana
Effigy Mounds National Monument	Iowa
Herbert Hoover National Historic Site	Iowa
Brown v. Board of Education National Historical Park	Kansas
Fort Larned National Historic Site	Kansas
Fort Scott National Historic Site	Kansas
Nicodemus National Historic Site	Kansas
Tallgrass Prairie National Preserve	Kansas
Abraham Lincoln Birthplace National Historical Park	Kentucky
Camp Nelson National Monument	Kentucky
Cumberland Gap National Historical Park	Kentucky
Cumberland Gap National Historical Park	Tennessee
Cumberland Gap National Historical Park	Virginia
**Mammoth Cave National Park**	Kentucky
Mill Springs Battlefield National Monument	Kentucky
Cane River Creole National Historical Park	Louisiana
Jean Lafitte National Historical Park and Preserve	Louisiana
New Orleans Jazz National Historical Park	Louisiana
Poverty Point National Monument	Louisiana
**Acadia National Park**	Maine
Frances Perkins National Monument	Maine
Katahdin Woods and Waters National Monument	Maine
Saint Croix Island International Historic Site	Maine
Antietam National Battlefield	Maryland
Assateague Island National Seashore	Maryland
Assateague Island National Seashore	Virginia
Catoctin Mountain Park	Maryland
Chesapeake and Ohio Canal National Historical Park	Maryland
Chesapeake and Ohio Canal National Historical Park	District of Columbia
Potomac Heritage National Scenic Trail (Note: Headquartered at Chesapeake and Ohio Canal National Historical Park, another unit on this list.)	Maryland
Potomac Heritage National Scenic Trail	Pennsylvania
Potomac Heritage National Scenic Trail	Virginia
Potomac Heritage National Scenic Trail	District of Columbia
Fort McHenry National Monument and Historic Shrine	Maryland
Hampton National Historic Site	Maryland
Harriet Tubman Underground Railroad National Historical Park	Maryland
Monocacy National Battlefield	Maryland
Thomas Stone National Historic Site	Maryland
Adams National Historical Park	Massachusetts
Boston African American National Historic Site	Massachusetts
Boston Harbor Islands National Recreation Area	Massachusetts
Boston National Historical Park	Massachusetts
Cape Cod National Seashore	Massachusetts
Frederick Law Olmsted National Historic Site	Massachusetts
John F. Kennedy National Historic Site	Massachusetts
Longfellow House–Washington's Headquarters National Historic Site	Massachusetts
Lowell National Historical Park	Massachusetts
Minute Man National Historical Park	Massachusetts
New Bedford Whaling National Historical Park	Massachusetts
Salem Maritime National Historical Park	Massachusetts
Saugus Iron Works National Historic Site	Massachusetts
Springfield Armory National Historic Site	Massachusetts
New England National Scenic Trail (Note: Headquartered at Springfield Armory National Historic Site, another unit on this list.)	Connecticut
New England National Scenic Trail	Massachusetts
**Isle Royale National Park**	Michigan
Keweenaw National Historical Park	Michigan
North Country National Scenic Trail	Michigan
North Country National Scenic Trail	Minnesota
North Country National Scenic Trail	North Dakota
North Country National Scenic Trail	New York
North Country National Scenic Trail	Ohio
North Country National Scenic Trail	Pennsylvania
North Country National Scenic Trail	Vermont
North Country National Scenic Trail	Wisconsin
Pictured Rocks National Lakeshore	Michigan
River Raisin National Battlefield Park	Michigan
Sleeping Bear Dunes National Lakeshore	Michigan
Grand Portage National Monument	Minnesota
Mississippi National River and Recreation Area	Minnesota
Pipestone National Monument	Minnesota
**Voyageurs National Park**	Minnesota
Brices Cross Roads National Battlefield Site	Mississippi
Emmett Till and Mamie Till-Mobley National Monument	Illinois
Emmett Till and Mamie Till-Mobley National Monument	Mississippi
Medgar and Myrlie Evers Home National Monument	Mississippi
Natchez National Historical Park	Mississippi
Natchez Trace Parkway	Mississippi
Natchez Trace Parkway	Alabama
Natchez Trace Parkway	Tennessee
Natchez Trace National Scenic Trail (Note: Operated under Natchez Trace Parkway, another unit on this list.)	Mississippi
Natchez Trace National Scenic Trail	Alabama
Natchez Trace National Scenic Trail	Tennessee
Tupelo National Battlefield	Mississippi
Vicksburg National Military Park	Mississippi
Vicksburg National Military Park	Louisiana
**Gateway Arch National Park**	Missouri
George Washington Carver National Monument	Missouri
Harry S. Truman National Historic Site	Missouri
Ozark National Scenic Riverways	Missouri
Ste. Genevieve National Historical Park	Missouri
Ulysses S. Grant National Historic Site	Missouri
Wilson's Creek National Battlefield	Missouri
Big Hole National Battlefield	Montana
Bighorn Canyon National Recreation Area	Montana
Bighorn Canyon National Recreation Area	Wyoming
**Glacier National Park**	Montana
Grant-Kohrs Ranch National Historic Site	Montana
Little Bighorn Battlefield National Monument	Montana
Agate Fossil Beds National Monument	Nebraska
Homestead National Historical Park	Nebraska
Missouri National Recreational River	Nebraska
Missouri National Recreational River	South Dakota
Niobrara National Scenic River	Nebraska
Scotts Bluff National Monument	Nebraska
**Great Basin National Park**	Nevada
Lake Mead National Recreation Area	Nevada
Lake Mead National Recreation Area	Arizona
Tule Springs Fossil Beds National Monument	Nevada
Saint-Gaudens National Historical Park	New Hampshire
Delaware Water Gap National Recreation Area	New Jersey
Delaware Water Gap National Recreation Area	Pennsylvania
Middle Delaware National Scenic River (Note: Operated under Delaware Water Gap National Recreation Area, another unit on this list.)	New Jersey
Middle Delaware National Scenic River	Pennsylvania
Great Egg Harbor Scenic and Recreational River	New Jersey
Morristown National Historical Park	New Jersey
Paterson Great Falls National Historical Park	New Jersey
Thomas Edison National Historical Park	New Jersey
Aztec Ruins National Monument	New Mexico
Bandelier National Monument	New Mexico
Capulin Volcano National Monument	New Mexico
**Carlsbad Caverns National Park**	New Mexico
Chaco Culture National Historical Park	New Mexico
El Malpais National Monument	New Mexico
El Morro National Monument	New Mexico
Fort Union National Monument	New Mexico
Gila Cliff Dwellings National Monument	New Mexico
Manhattan Project National Historical Park	New Mexico
Manhattan Project National Historical Park	Tennessee
Manhattan Project National Historical Park	Washington
Pecos National Historical Park	New Mexico
Petroglyph National Monument	New Mexico
Salinas Pueblo Missions National Monument	New Mexico
Valles Caldera National Preserve	New Mexico
**White Sands National Park**	New Mexico
Eleanor Roosevelt National Historic Site	New York
Fire Island National Seashore	New York
Fort Stanwix National Monument	New York
Harriet Tubman National Historical Park	New York
Home of Franklin D. Roosevelt National Historic Site	New York
Martin Van Buren National Historic Site	New York
Sagamore Hill National Historic Site	New York
Saratoga National Historical Park	New York
Theodore Roosevelt Inaugural National Historic Site	New York
Vanderbilt Mansion National Historic Site	New York
Women's Rights National Historical Park	New York
African Burial Ground National Monument (Note: Operated under National Parks of New York Harbor.)	New York
Castle Clinton National Monument	New York
Federal Hall National Memorial	New York
Gateway National Recreation Area	New York
Gateway National Recreation Area	New Jersey
General Grant National Memorial	New York
Governors Island National Monument	New York
Hamilton Grange National Memorial	New York
Saint Paul's Church National Historic Site	New York
Statue of Liberty National Monument	New York
Statue of Liberty National Monument	New Jersey
Stonewall National Monument	New York
Theodore Roosevelt Birthplace National Historic Site	New York
Blue Ridge Parkway	North Carolina
Blue Ridge Parkway	Virginia
Cape Hatteras National Seashore	North Carolina
Cape Lookout National Seashore	North Carolina
Carl Sandburg Home National Historic Site	North Carolina
Fort Raleigh National Historic Site	North Carolina
Guilford Courthouse National Military Park	North Carolina
Moores Creek National Battlefield	North Carolina
Wright Brothers National Memorial	North Carolina
Fort Union Trading Post National Historic Site	North Dakota
Fort Union Trading Post National Historic Site	Montana
Knife River Indian Villages National Historic Site	North Dakota
**Theodore Roosevelt National Park**	North Dakota
Charles Young Buffalo Soldiers National Monument	Ohio
**Cuyahoga Valley National Park**	Ohio
Dayton Aviation Heritage National Historical Park	Ohio
First Ladies National Historic Site	Ohio
Hopewell Culture National Historical Park	Ohio
James A. Garfield National Historic Site	Ohio
Perry's Victory and International Peace Memorial	Ohio
William Howard Taft National Historic Site	Ohio
Chickasaw National Recreation Area	Oklahoma
Washita Battlefield National Historic Site	Oklahoma
**Crater Lake National Park**	Oregon
Lewis and Clark National Historical Park	Oregon
Lewis and Clark National Historical Park	Washington
John Day Fossil Beds National Monument	Oregon
Oregon Caves National Monument and Preserve	Oregon
Allegheny Portage Railroad National Historic Site	Pennsylvania
Carlisle Federal Indian Boarding School National Monument	Pennsylvania
Edgar Allan Poe National Historic Site	Pennsylvania
Eisenhower National Historic Site	Pennsylvania
Flight 93 National Memorial	Pennsylvania
Fort Necessity National Battlefield	Pennsylvania
Friendship Hill National Historic Site	Pennsylvania
Gettysburg National Military Park	Pennsylvania
Hopewell Furnace National Historic Site	Pennsylvania
Independence National Historical Park	Pennsylvania
Johnstown Flood National Memorial	Pennsylvania
Steamtown National Historic Site	Pennsylvania
Thaddeus Kosciuszko National Memorial	Pennsylvania
Upper Delaware Scenic and Recreational River	Pennsylvania
Valley Forge National Historical Park	Pennsylvania
San Juan National Historic Site	Puerto Rico
Blackstone River Valley National Historical Park	Rhode Island
Blackstone River Valley National Historical Park	Massachusetts
Roger Williams National Memorial	Rhode Island
Charles Pinckney National Historic Site	South Carolina
**Congaree National Park**	South Carolina
Cowpens National Battlefield	South Carolina
Fort Sumter and Fort Moultrie National Historical Park	South Carolina
Kings Mountain National Military Park	South Carolina
Ninety Six National Historic Site	South Carolina
Reconstruction Era National Historical Park	South Carolina
**Badlands National Park**	South Dakota
Jewel Cave National Monument	South Dakota
Minuteman Missile National Historic Site	South Dakota
Mount Rushmore National Memorial	South Dakota
**Wind Cave National Park**	South Dakota
Andrew Johnson National Historic Site	Tennessee
Big South Fork National River and Recreation Area	Tennessee
Big South Fork National River and Recreation Area	Kentucky
Fort Donelson National Battlefield	Tennessee
Fort Donelson National Battlefield	Kentucky
**Great Smoky Mountains National Park**	Tennessee
**Great Smoky Mountains National Park**	North Carolina
Obed Wild and Scenic River	Tennessee
Shiloh National Military Park	Tennessee
Shiloh National Military Park	Mississippi
Stones River National Battlefield	Tennessee
Alibates Flint Quarries National Monument	Texas
Amistad National Recreation Area	Texas
**Big Bend National Park**	Texas
Rio Grande Wild and Scenic River (Note: Operated under Big Bend National Park, another unit on this list.)	Texas
Big Thicket National Preserve	Texas
Blackwell School National Historic Site	Texas
Chamizal National Memorial	Texas
Fort Davis National Historic Site	Texas
**Guadalupe Mountains National Park**	Texas
Lake Meredith National Recreation Area	Texas
Lyndon B. Johnson National Historical Park	Texas
Padre Island National Seashore	Texas
Palo Alto Battlefield National Historical Park	Texas
San Antonio Missions National Historical Park	Texas
Waco Mammoth National Monument	Texas
**Arches National Park**	Utah
**Bryce Canyon National Park**	Utah
**Canyonlands National Park**	Utah
**Capitol Reef National Park**	Utah
Cedar Breaks National Monument	Utah
Golden Spike National Historical Park	Utah
Natural Bridges National Monument	Utah
Rainbow Bridge National Monument (Note: Administered by Glen Canyon National Recreation Area, another unit on this list.)	Utah
Timpanogos Cave National Monument	Utah
**Zion National Park**	Utah
Marsh-Billings-Rockefeller National Historical Park	Vermont
Buck Island Reef National Monument	Virgin Islands
Christiansted National Historic Site	Virgin Islands
Salt River Bay National Historical Park and Ecological Preserve	Virgin Islands
**Virgin Islands National Park**	Virgin Islands
Virgin Islands Coral Reef National Monument (Note: Operated under Virgin Islands National Park, another unit on this list.)	Virgin Islands
Appomattox Court House National Historical Park	Virginia
Booker T. Washington National Monument	Virginia
Cedar Creek and Belle Grove National Historical Park	Virginia
Colonial National Historical Park	Virginia
Fort Monroe National Monument	Virginia
Fredericksburg and Spotsylvania National Military Park	Virginia
George Washington Birthplace National Monument	Virginia
George Washington Memorial Parkway	Virginia
George Washington Memorial Parkway	Maryland
George Washington Memorial Parkway	District of Columbia
Arlington House, The Robert E. Lee Memorial (Note: Operated under George Washington Memorial Parkway, another unit on this list.)	Virginia
Clara Barton National Historic Site	Maryland
Lyndon Baines Johnson Memorial Grove on the Potomac	District of Columbia
Theodore Roosevelt Island	District of Columbia
Maggie L. Walker National Historic Site	Virginia
Manassas National Battlefield Park	Virginia
Petersburg National Battlefield	Virginia
Prince William Forest Park	Virginia
Richmond National Battlefield Park	Virginia
**Shenandoah National Park**	Virginia
Wolf Trap National Park for the Performing Arts	Virginia
Ebey's Landing National Historical Reserve	Washington
Fort Vancouver National Historic Site	Washington
Fort Vancouver National Historic Site	Oregon
Lake Roosevelt National Recreation Area	Washington
**Mount Rainier National Park**	Washington
**North Cascades National Park**	Washington
Lake Chelan National Recreation Area (Note: Operated under North Cascades National Park, another unit on this list.)	Washington
Ross Lake National Recreation Area	Washington
**Olympic National Park**	Washington
San Juan Island National Historical Park	Washington
Whitman Mission National Historic Site	Washington
Harpers Ferry National Historical Park	West Virginia
Appalachian National Scenic Trail	Maine to Georgia
**New River Gorge National Park and Preserve**	West Virginia
Bluestone National Scenic River (Note: Administered by New River Gorge National Park and Preserve, another unit on this list.)	West Virginia
Gauley River National Recreation Area	West Virginia
Apostle Islands National Lakeshore	Wisconsin
Ice Age National Scenic Trail	Wisconsin
Saint Croix National Scenic Riverway	Wisconsin
Saint Croix National Scenic Riverway	Minnesota
Devils Tower National Monument	Wyoming
Fort Laramie National Historic Site	Wyoming
Fossil Butte National Monument	Wyoming
**Grand Teton National Park**	Wyoming
John D. Rockefeller Jr. Memorial Parkway (Note: Operated under Grand Teton National Park, another unit on this list.)	Wyoming
**Yellowstone National Park**	Wyoming
**Yellowstone National Park**	Idaho
**Yellowstone National Park**	Montana

== See also ==
- List of areas in the United States National Park System
- List of fee areas in the United States National Park System
- List of all national parks of the world
- List of World Heritage Sites in the United States
- List of U.S. state parks
- National Park Passport Stamps
- National Park Travelers Club
- National Register of Historic Places
