= Noatak =

Noatak may refer to one of the following:

- Noatak, Alaska
- Noatak River
- Noatak National Preserve
- Noatak Wilderness
