= National preserve =

Protected areas in the United States

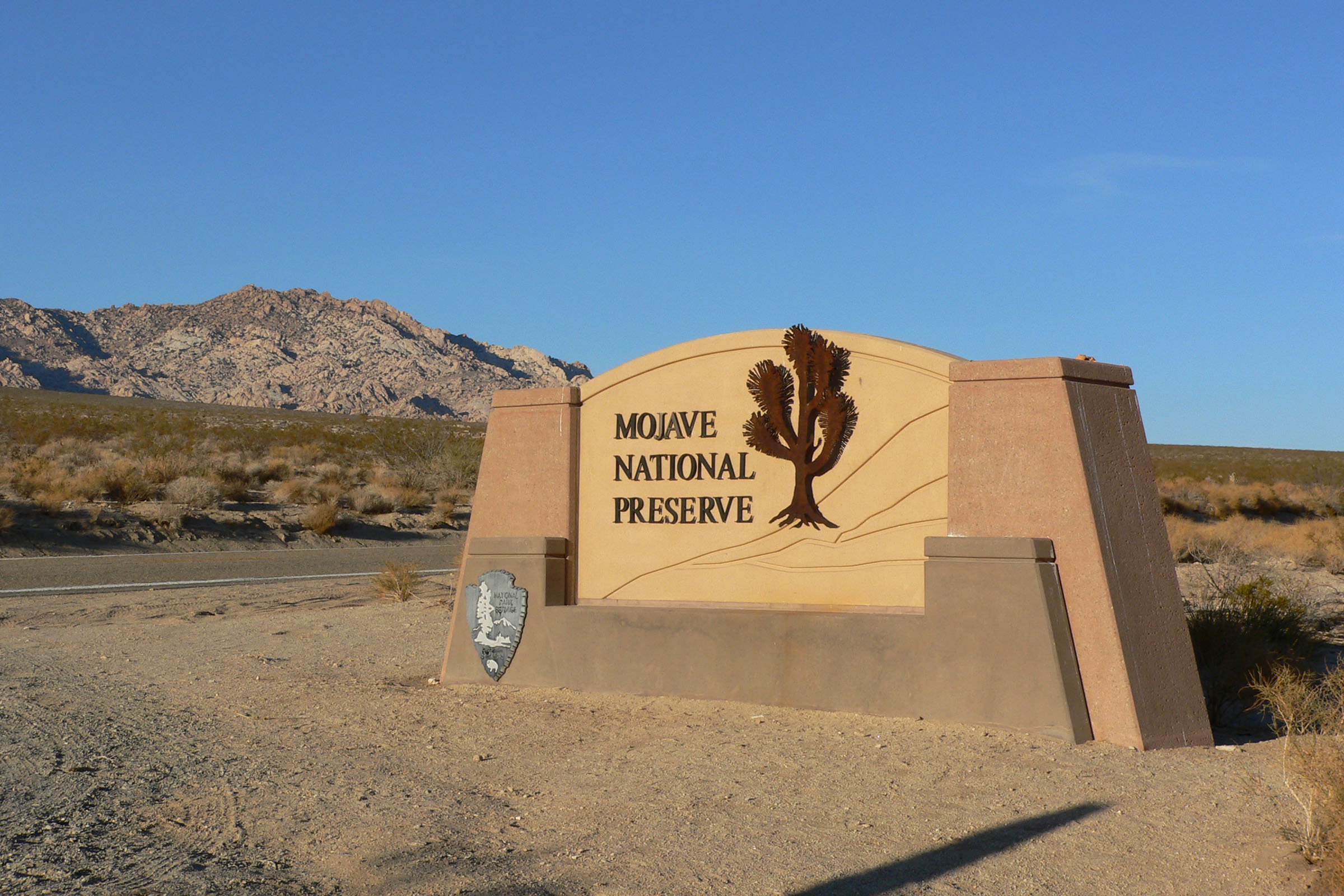
Entrance sign to Mojave National Preserve

Interactive map of the national preserves

There are 21 protected areas of the United States designated as national preserves. They were established by an act of Congress to protect areas that have resources often associated with national parks but where certain natural resource–extractive activities such as hunting and mining may be permitted, provided their natural values are preserved. The activities permitted in each national preserve vary depending on the enabling legislation of the unit. All national preserves are managed by the National Park Service (NPS) as part of the National Park System.

Eleven national preserves are co-managed with national parks or national monuments; because hunting is forbidden in those units, preserves provide a similar level of protection from development but allow hunting and in some cases grazing. Nine of those are counted as separate official units, while New River Gorge National Park and Preserve and Oregon Caves National Monument and Preserve are each single units, though there is no administrative difference. The remaining ten are stand-alone units. Jean Lafitte National Historical Park and Preserve has a preserve site that is managed like one, but is not distinguished as a national preserve in the authorizing legislation and is not listed here. The Salt River Bay National Historical Park and Ecological Preserve is a unique designation that is dissimilar to national preserves.

National preserves are located in eleven states; Alaska is home to ten of them, including the largest, Noatak National Preserve. Their total area is 24,651,566 acres (9,976,135 ha), 86% of which is in Alaska. All national preserves except Tallgrass Prairie permit hunting in accordance with local regulations. A national preserve differs from a national reserve as management of reserves can be delegated to the state in which they are located.

== History ==
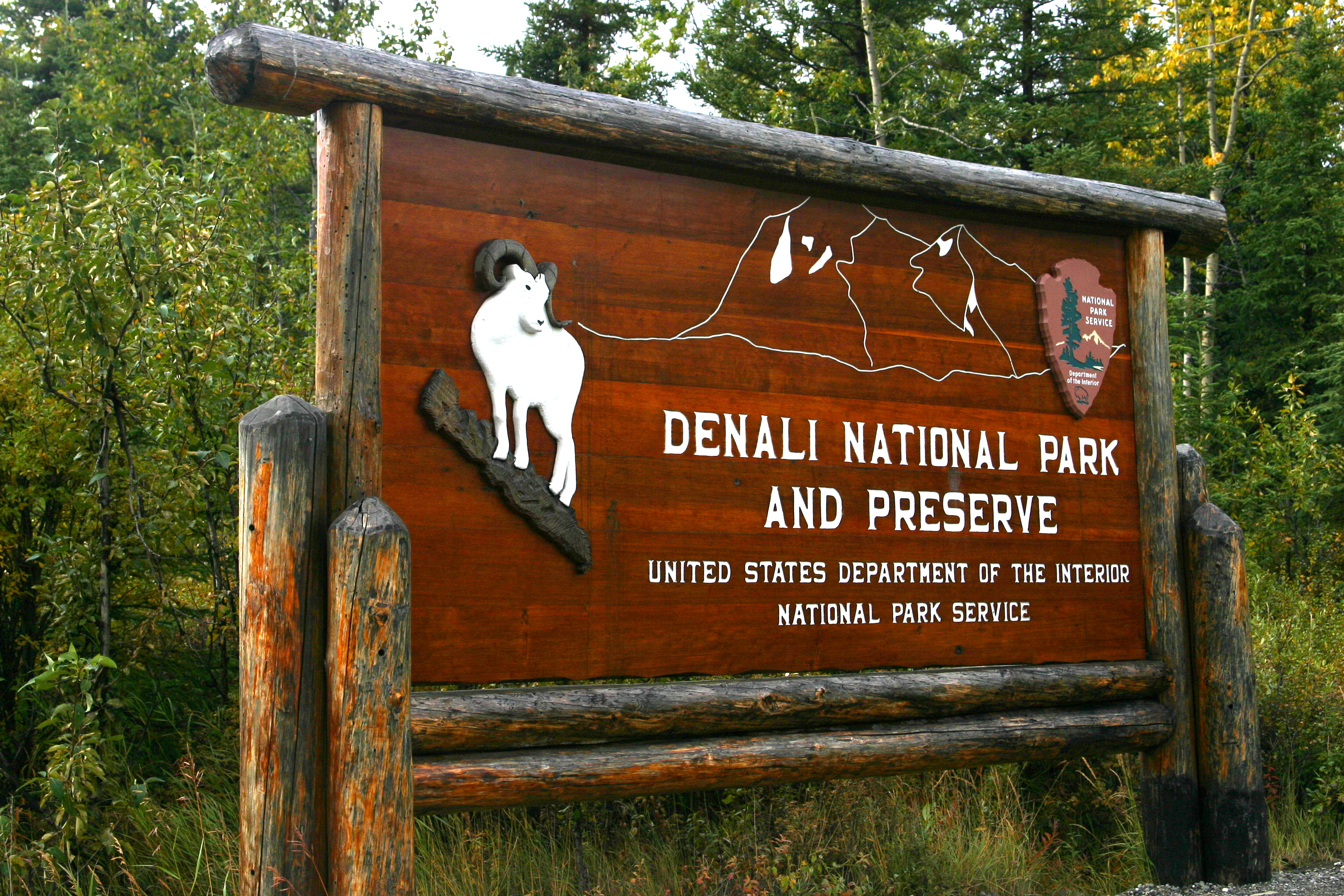
Entrance sign to Denali National Park and Preserve

The first national preserves were Big Thicket National Preserve in Texas and Big Cypress National Preserve in Florida, both established in 1974. The Big Cypress Swamp, adjacent to Everglades National Park and originally intended to be included in it, was at risk of destruction by a proposed airport. Opposition by conservationists and studies showing the swamp's role in water protection led to its cancellation after one runway was built, and President Richard Nixon proposed the area's preservation as Big Cypress National Fresh Water Reserve to protect the local water supply. Congressional deliberation resulted in a new designation of a national preserve that bought out private landowners to conserve "the natural, scenic, hydrologic, floral and faunaI, and recreational values of the Big Cypress Watershed," though off-road vehicle use, oil extraction, hunting, and traditional use by the Miccosukee and Seminole Tribes are permitted.

The Big Thicket, a large area of swamps and forests, was originally proposed to be preserved as a state park or national park, but these were opposed by timber firms who wanted to retain their logging lands. A 1967 survey by the National Park Service proposed establishing nine units representative of the variety of plant life in the region, but because the thicket was already fragmented by roads and logging, it would not qualify as a national park. National monument was also deemed a suboptimal designation, and compromise on the boundary and management provisions eventually led to its establishment as a national preserve. The bills creating both preserves were signed on the same day by President Gerald Ford and contained similar wording limiting construction, agriculture, and mineral extraction to that still assuring the area's "natural and ecological integrity in perpetuity," while permitting hunting.

Following President Jimmy Carter's 1978 establishment of 17 national monuments in Alaska, the Alaska National Interest Lands Conservation Act of 1980 redesignated four as national preserves and six as national parks or monuments paired with a preserve. These had been recommended during the legislative process as early as 1974 to resolve the issue of sport hunting at Lake Clark after it was used for Big Thicket and Big Cypress. While this was not the primary factor in the naming of the original national preserves, it presented a compromise to protect scenic lands and allow hunting in the National Park System without breaking precedent in parks and monuments that forbid it. The national preserves are managed in the same way as national parks, except that regulated hunting, fishing, and trapping for sport and subsistence are permitted, though the NPS can close areas to such practices as needed. Although hunting was also allowed at most national recreation areas, this was a major change in NPS wildlife management with a fifth of its land now open to it.

Five new units were established from 1988 to 2000, two of which are partnerships with local governments and landowners. The Timucuan Ecological and Historic Preserve includes sites owned by Florida State Parks, the city of Jacksonville, and private landowners. The Tallgrass Prairie National Preserve is so designated to accommodate a public-private partnership reducing federal land ownership, and it is almost entirely owned by The Nature Conservancy. Valles Caldera National Preserve was originally established in 2000 to be operated by an independent trust, but its management was transferred to the National Park Service in 2015.

The four most recently established national preserves were all expansions or redesignations of existing NPS sites. Great Sand Dunes National Monument was redesignated a national park, and the mountainous wilderness area transferred to it from the U.S. Forest Service became the preserve. President Bill Clinton expanded Craters of the Moon National Monument using the Antiquities Act, and most of the expanded area was redesignated a national preserve two years later to permit hunting. Oregon Caves National Monument gained its preserve lands from Rogue River–Siskiyou National Forest, increasing the unit's size ninefold. Ten percent of New River Gorge National River was redesignated a national park where hunting was disallowed, and the remainder became New River Gorge National Preserve with little change.

== List of national preserves ==
Preserves paired with a national park or monument do not have visitation separately recorded. Their combined visitor counts are marked in italics, as the number visiting the preserve portions may be substantially smaller. Among these eleven, only Lake Clark and Wrangell–St. Elias have most of their facilities in the preserve.

List of national preserves
Name	Image	Location	Managed with	Date established	Area	Visitors (2020)	Notes
Aniakchak	Wide flat beach with snow-capped mountains in the background	Alaska 56.8°N 157.7°W	Monument	Dec 2, 1980	464,117 acres (187,821.5 ha)	36	The coastal plains and mountains of the Aleutian Range around Mount Aniakchak, a 3,700-year-old volcanic caldera, make up this facility-free preserve reachable only by plane. In addition to hiking and hunting, some visitors raft down the Aniakchak River, a National Wild River, from the volcano to the sea, though its inaccessibility and unpredictable weather make it the least-visited unit of the National Park System.
Bering Land Bridge	View from the top a hill of a grassy valley and rocks in the foreground	Alaska 65.83°N 164.17°W	–	Dec 2, 1980	2,697,391 acres (1,091,595.4 ha)	2,642	The pristine Seward Peninsula is what remains of the ice age Bering land bridge. The Chukchi Sea coast, Imuruk Lake volcanic field, maar lakes, and tundra support Arctic animals including migrating caribou, polar bears, walrus, muskox, and ribbon seals. Visitors snowmobile, watch for 170 species of birds, soak in hot springs, and hike on tundra and lava fields.
Big Cypress	A stand of white cypress trees growing out of the water	Florida 25.86°N 81.03°W	–	Oct 11, 1974	720,564 acres (291,601.9 ha)	1,181,930	Adjoining Everglades National Park, the Big Cypress Swamp is home to mangroves, cypress trees, alligators, and Florida panthers. It can be accessed by hiking along the start of the Florida Trail, biking, canoeing, kayaking, airboat, and swamp buggies.
Big Thicket	Scattered narrow trees among an expanse of shrubs	Texas 30.55°N 94.34°W	–	Oct 11, 1974	113,121 acres (45,778.4 ha)	309,053	The Big Thicket includes several diverse ecosystems within the Piney Woods, with upland pine habitats, open grassy areas, sloped deciduous forests, floodplains, prairies, and swamps intertwined together, but little old-growth forest remains. They are home to nine-banded armadillos, bobcats, river otters, alligators, and 33 snakes. Nine major units are connected by six waterway corridors along the Neches River and its tributary creeks.
Craters of the Moon	Dark lava flow with grasses growing out of its cracks and a forested hillside in the background	Idaho 42.26°N 113.38°W	Monument	Aug 21, 2002	410,733 acres (166,217.7 ha)	250,872	This preserve covers most of the lava fields of the Great Rift of Idaho that erupted 15,000 to 2,000 years ago. Its volcanic features include many cinder cones and spatter cones, lava tubes and fissures, and tree molds made of ʻaʻa, pahoehoe, and block lava. These basaltic flows support wildflowers, shrubs, limber pines, and Rocky Mountain junipers.
Denali	Aerial photo of the Denali and the snowy Alaska Range with a glacier leading to a river	Alaska 62.5°N 152.3°W	Park	Dec 2, 1980	1,334,117 acres (539,898.0 ha)	54,850	With the national park centered around Denali, the national preserve has two sections: one to the northwest encompassing lakes in the Highpower Creek and Muddy River areas and one including the southwest end of the Alaska Range around Mount Dall and Dall Glacier, the Kichatna Mountains, and the Yentna River.
Gates of the Arctic	Still lake reflecting a steep, wide, rocky mountain ridge	Alaska 66.9°N 154.7°W	Park	Dec 2, 1980	948,608 acres (383,888.0 ha)	2,872	The preserve has two sections, one on the northeast of the park around the Itkillik River and the other on the south side around the Kobuk River. Beyond viewing and hunting black bear, grizzly bear, Dall sheep, moose, and smaller game, visitors can float and fish on the Kobuk, a designated Wild River.
Glacier Bay	Aerial photo of the mouth of a river with several small islands, next to a sandy peninsula with mountains in the background	Alaska 59.1°N 138.4°W	Park	Dec 2, 1980	58,406 acres (23,636.1 ha)	5,784	While Glacier Bay and its surrounding mountainous icefields and tidewater glaciers make up the national park, the preserve is a flatter area in the northwest between the Alsek River, its Dry Bay delta, and the Deception Hills. Visitors fish and hunt, raft the river, and ATV on trails.
Great Sand Dunes	Aerial photo of the Great Sand Dunes partially surrounded by a mountains range with ridges and valleys	Colorado 37.8°N 105.5°W	Park	Nov 22, 2000	41,686 acres (16,869.7 ha)	461,532	This preserve includes the Sangre de Cristo Mountains, including Tijeras Peak and Mount Herard, that rise above North America's tallest sand dunes in the national park. Trails among the montane forests lead up to alpine lakes and Mosca Pass.
Katmai	A hiker stands on a mountain summit near a rocky outcropping, with a vast landscape with lakes in the background	Alaska 59.1°N 155.2°W	Park	Dec 2, 1980	418,698 acres (169,441.1 ha)	51,511	Nonvianuk Lake and Kukaklek Lake, source of the Alagnak Wild River, and Moraine and Funnel Creeks are rich with salmon that attract a large population of bears. There are no roads but it has fly-in access to fly fishing, backpacking, and bear and moose hunting.
Lake Clark	Aerial photo of a long Lake Clark with snowy mountains behind it	Alaska 60.97°N 153.92°W	Park	Dec 2, 1980	1,410,293 acres (570,725.3 ha)	4,948	Lake Clark and other glacially carved lakes near the Chigmit Mountains are important spawning grounds for sockeye salmon. The valley and foothill areas are rich with boreal forests that provide habitat for brown and black bears, Dall sheep, moose, caribou, peregrine falcon, and timber wolf.
Little River Canyon	A waterfall flows over rocks by a forest in fall colors	Alabama 34.44°N 85.6°W	–	Oct 24, 1992	15,291 acres (6,188.0 ha)	802,375	The Little River flows atop Lookout Mountain, with waterfalls, bluffs, and cliffs along its canyon. A scenic highway runs along the rim, with hiking trails down to the river for rock climbing, fishing, and kayaking.
Mojave	Rocky desert mountains with shrubs and yucca plants in the foreground	California 34.9°N 115.7°W	–	Oct 31, 1994	1,547,955 acres (626,435.2 ha)	608,633	The Mojave Desert is characterized by its warm but temperate climate, featuring Creosote bush, cholla cacti, and a Joshua tree forest. The region includes the 600 ft (180 m) tall Kelso Dunes that sing, the Cima volcanic field with dozens of cinder cones and lava fields, and abandoned homesteads and mines.
New River Gorge	Grandview overlook of the New River in a horseshoe bend with a V-shaped valley covered in forest	West Virginia 37.87°N 81.03°W	Park	Dec 21, 2020	65,165 acres (26,371.3 ha)	1,054,374	The New River, one of the oldest rivers in North America, carved this V-shaped canyon in the Appalachian Mountains with sandstone and shale cliffs popular for advanced rock climbing. Its ancient Appalachian mixed mesophytic forest on varied topography connects northern mountain and Atlantic coastal species for a highly diverse ecosystem. The river's enormous rapids provide for excellent whitewater rafting.
Noatak	Wide treeless valley between sloping mountains with a snow-capped mountain in the background	Alaska 68°N 159.5°W	–	Dec 2, 1980	6,587,071 acres (2,665,693.1 ha)	12,533	The pristine Noatak River basin lies between the Baird and De Long Mountains of the Brooks Range, connecting tundra to taiga. It is a migration route for hundreds of thousands of caribou, Alaska moose, and brown bears.
Oregon Caves	Overlook of a forested mountainside from above	Oregon 42.1°N 123.38°W	Monument	Dec 19, 2014	4,070 acres (1,647.1 ha)	22,789	While the marble Oregon Caves extend deep under the national monument, above ground the preserve has forests, meadows, streams, and mountains. Hiking trails lead to Mount Elijah and the Bigelow Lakes with views of the Siskiyou Mountains.
Tallgrass Prairie	Black eyed Susan flowers among a rolling expanse of grass	Kansas 38.43°N 96.56°W	–	Nov 12, 1996	10,882 acres (4,403.8 ha)	29,009	Nearly all of the tallgrass prairie ecosystem has been replaced by farmland, and this area of the Flint Hills maintains its diverse plant and animal life at a former ranch. Controlled burns and a reintroduced bison herd keep the land fertile.
Timucuan Ecological and Historic Preserve	Sunset over a marsh with grasses growing in a river next to a forest	Florida 30.45°N 81.45°W	–	Feb 16, 1988	46,262 acres (18,721.6 ha)	1,017,373	These wetlands at the mouth of the Nassau and St. Johns Rivers have salt marshes, tropical hardwood hammocks, and coastal dunes. Archeological excavations have found Timucua artifacts dating back thousands of years. It also includes the Kingsley Plantation and Fort Caroline National Memorial.
Valles Caldera	Overlook of a large grassy meadow surrounded by the forested caldera rim	New Mexico 35.9°N 106.5°W	–	July 25, 2000	89,766 acres (36,327.0 ha)	30,434	The Valles Caldera was formed in a volcanic eruption 1.25 million years ago and still has an active geothermal system. Its rim is 13 mi (21 km) in diameter, with wide grassy meadow valleys divided by resurgent domes including Redondo Peak. There are large populations of elk, Gunnison's prairie dogs, badgers, and golden eagles.
Wrangell–St. Elias	Aerial photo of a long river coming from a distant glacier among the rocky mountains	Alaska 61.44°N 142.95°W	Park	Dec 2, 1980	4,852,644 acres (1,963,795.4 ha)	16,655	Paired with America's largest national park, this preserve is generally the lower-elevation areas around the Wrangell Mountains, including the Kennicott and Nabesna Glaciers that flow into the Nizina and Nabesna Rivers, respectively, that can be rafted. The abandoned Kennecott Mines were once a major source of copper and are now the preserve's main historic attraction.
Yukon–Charley Rivers	Aerial photo of the narrow horseshoe-bent Charley River flowing into the wide Yukon river with islands in the middle and nearby lakes	Alaska 65°N 143.5°W	–	Dec 2, 1980	2,526,512 acres (1,022,443.1 ha)	666	Including the entirety of the Charley River watershed and 130 mi (210 km) of the Yukon River, this preserve protects their surrounding mountains and bluffs that are habitat for diverse Arctic wildlife like peregrine falcons, caribou, and salmon. Summer visitors float down the rivers and see remnants of gold mining, and in the winter dog sledders race in the Yukon Quest.

== See also ==
- History of the National Park Service
- List of areas in the United States National Park System – National preserves
- List of national monuments of the United States
- List of the United States National Park System official units
