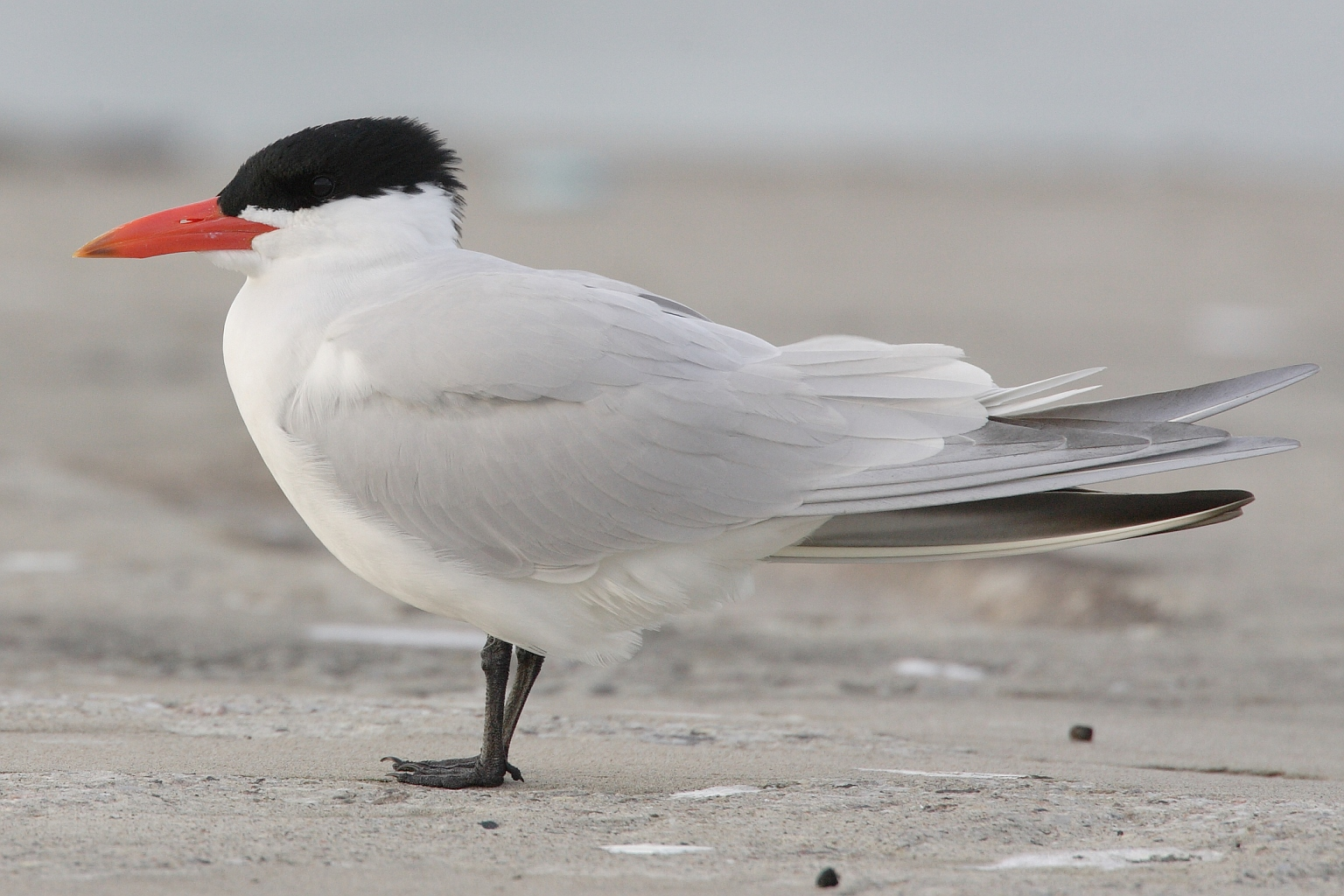
- Breeding plumage, Canada
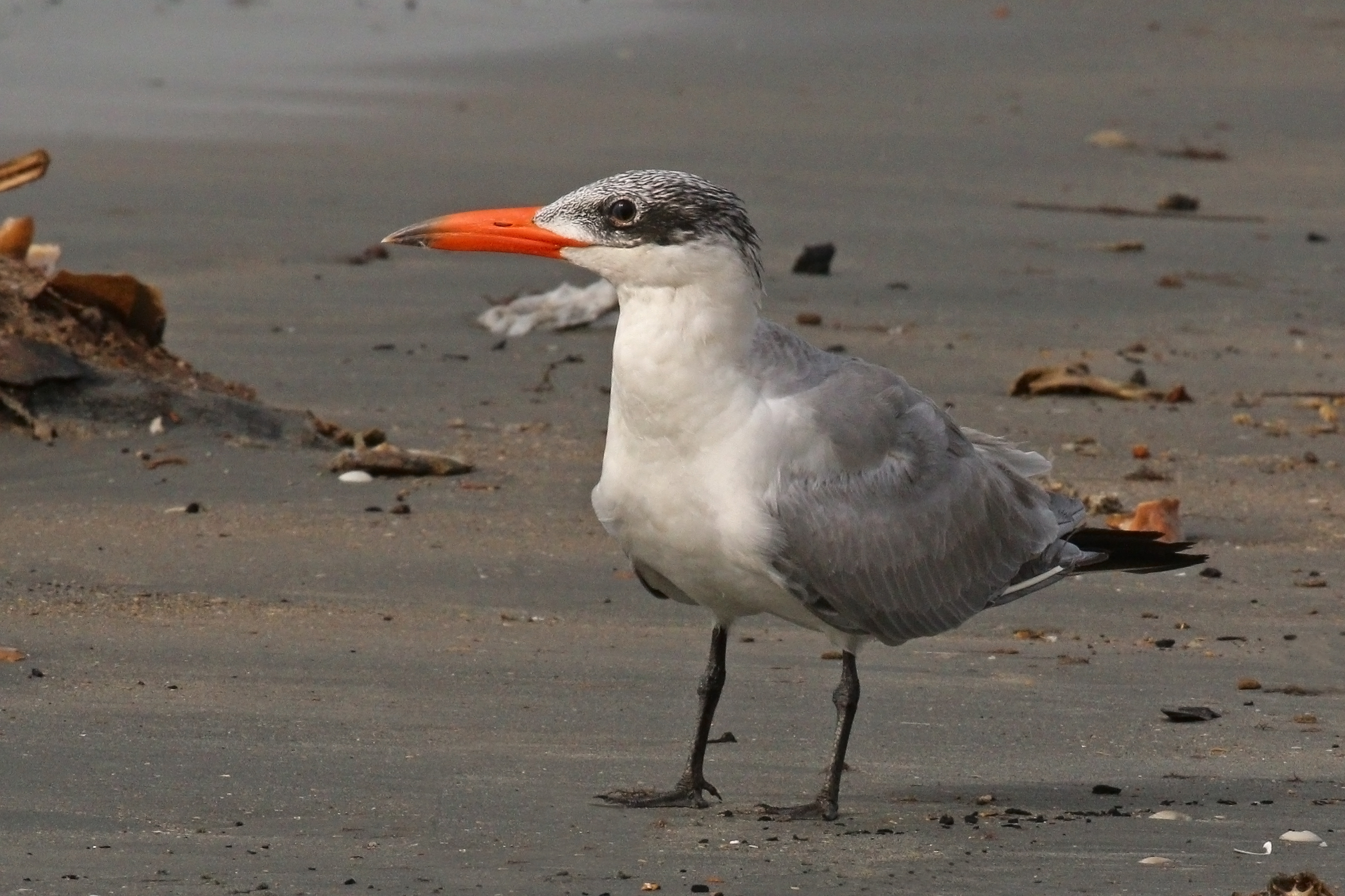
- Non-breeding plumage, The Gambia

Conservation status
- Least Concern (IUCN 3.1)

Scientific classification
- Kingdom: Animalia
- Phylum: Chordata
- Class: Aves
- Order: Charadriiformes
- Family: Laridae
- Genus: Hydroprogne; Kaup, 1829
- Species: H. caspia

Binomial name
- Hydroprogne caspia (Pallas, 1770)
- Geographical distribution of Caspian tern. Breeding Migration Year-round Nonbreeding

Synonyms
- Sterna caspia Pallas, 1770; Hydroprogne tschegrava Lepechin, 1770; Helopus caspius

= Caspian tern =

Species of bird

The Caspian tern (Hydroprogne caspia) is the world's largest species of tern, with a subcosmopolitan but scattered distribution. Despite its extensive range, it is monotypic of its genus, and has no accepted subspecies. The genus name is from Ancient Greek hudro-, "water-", and Latin progne, "swallow". The specific caspia is from Latin and, like the English name, refers to the Caspian Sea.

== Description ==
It is the world's largest tern with a length of 48–60 cm (19–24 in), a wingspan of 127–145 cm (50–57 in) and a weight of 530–782 g (18.7–27.6 oz). Adult birds have black legs, and a long thick red-orange bill with a small black tip. They have a white head with a black cap and white neck, belly, and tail. The upper wings and back are pale grey; the underwings are pale with dark primary feathers. In-flight, the tail is less forked than other terns, and wingtips are black on the underside. In winter, the black cap is still present (unlike many other terns), but with some white streaking on the forehead. The call is a loud heron-like croak.

== Distribution and habitat ==
Their breeding habitat is large lakes and ocean coasts in North America (including the Great Lakes), and locally in Europe (mainly around the Baltic Sea and Black Sea), Asia, Africa, and Australasia (Australia and New Zealand). North American birds migrate to southern coasts, the West Indies and northernmost South America. European and Asian birds spend the non-breeding season in the Old World tropics. African and Australasian birds are resident or disperse over short distances.

In 2016, a pair of Caspian terns bred successfully in the Cape Krusenstern National Monument in northwestern Alaska, 600 km further north than any previous North American breeding record. This development was part of a general trend in Alaska of species moving to the north, a tendency ascribed to global warming.

The global population is about 50,000 pairs; numbers in most regions are stable, but the Baltic Sea population (1400–1475 pairs in the early 1990s) is declining and of conservation concern.

The Caspian tern is one of the species to which the Agreement on the Conservation of African-Eurasian Migratory Waterbirds (AEWA) applies.

== Behaviour ==
=== Feeding ===
They feed mainly on fish, which they dive for, hovering high over the water and then plunging. They also occasionally eat large insects, the young and eggs of other birds and rodents. They may fly up to 60 km (37 mi) from the breeding colony to catch fish; they often fish on freshwater lakes as well as at sea.

=== Breeding ===
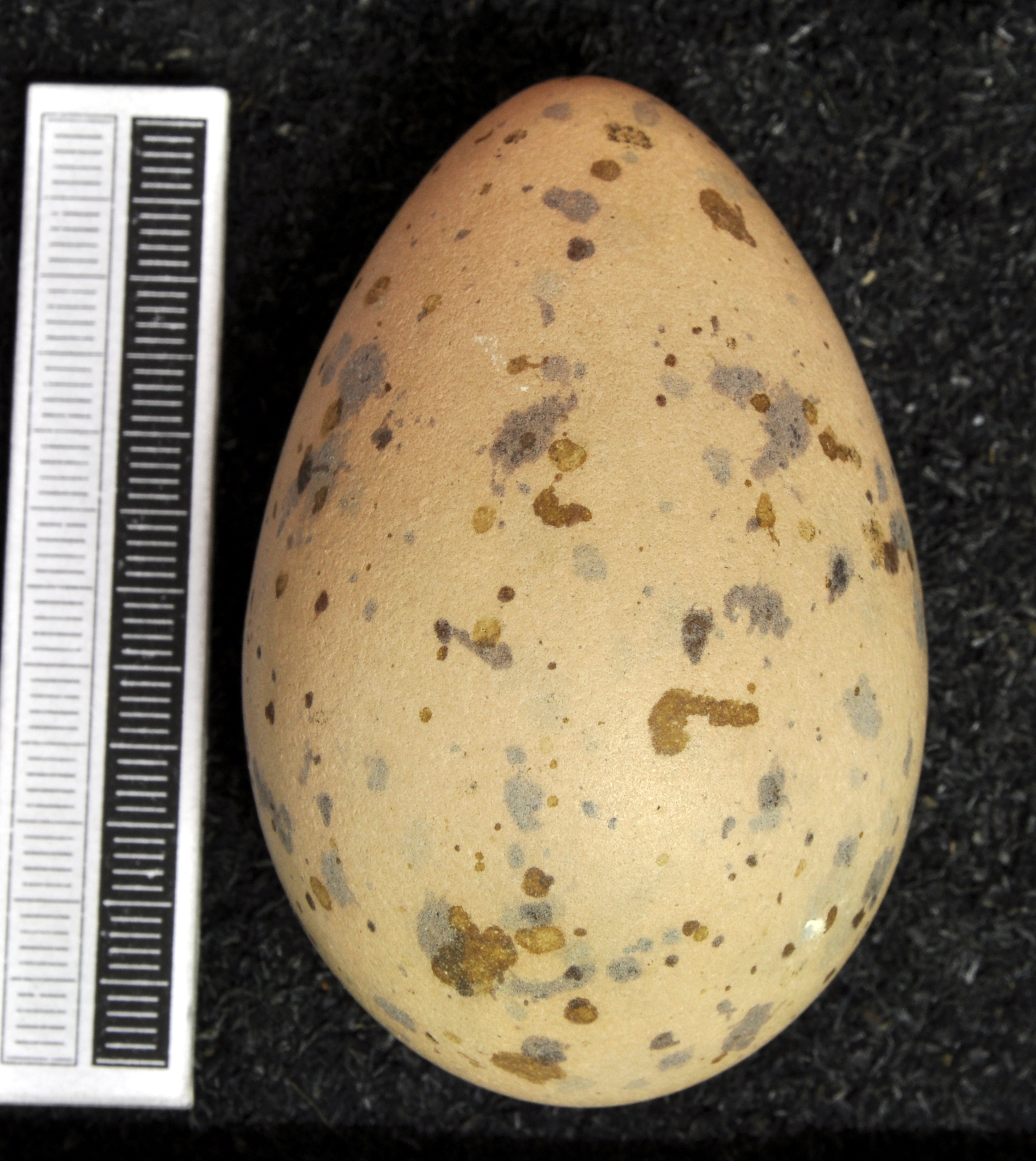
Egg, Collection Museum Wiesbaden

Breeding is in spring and summer, with one to three pale blue-green eggs, with heavy brown spotting, being laid. They nest either together in colonies, or singly in mixed colonies of other tern and gull species. The nest is on the ground among gravel and sand, or sometimes on vegetation; incubation lasts for 26–28 days. The chicks are variable in plumage pattern, from pale creamy to darker grey-brown; this variation assists adults in recognizing their own chicks when returning to the colony from feeding trips. Fledging occurs after 35–45 days.

== Gallery ==
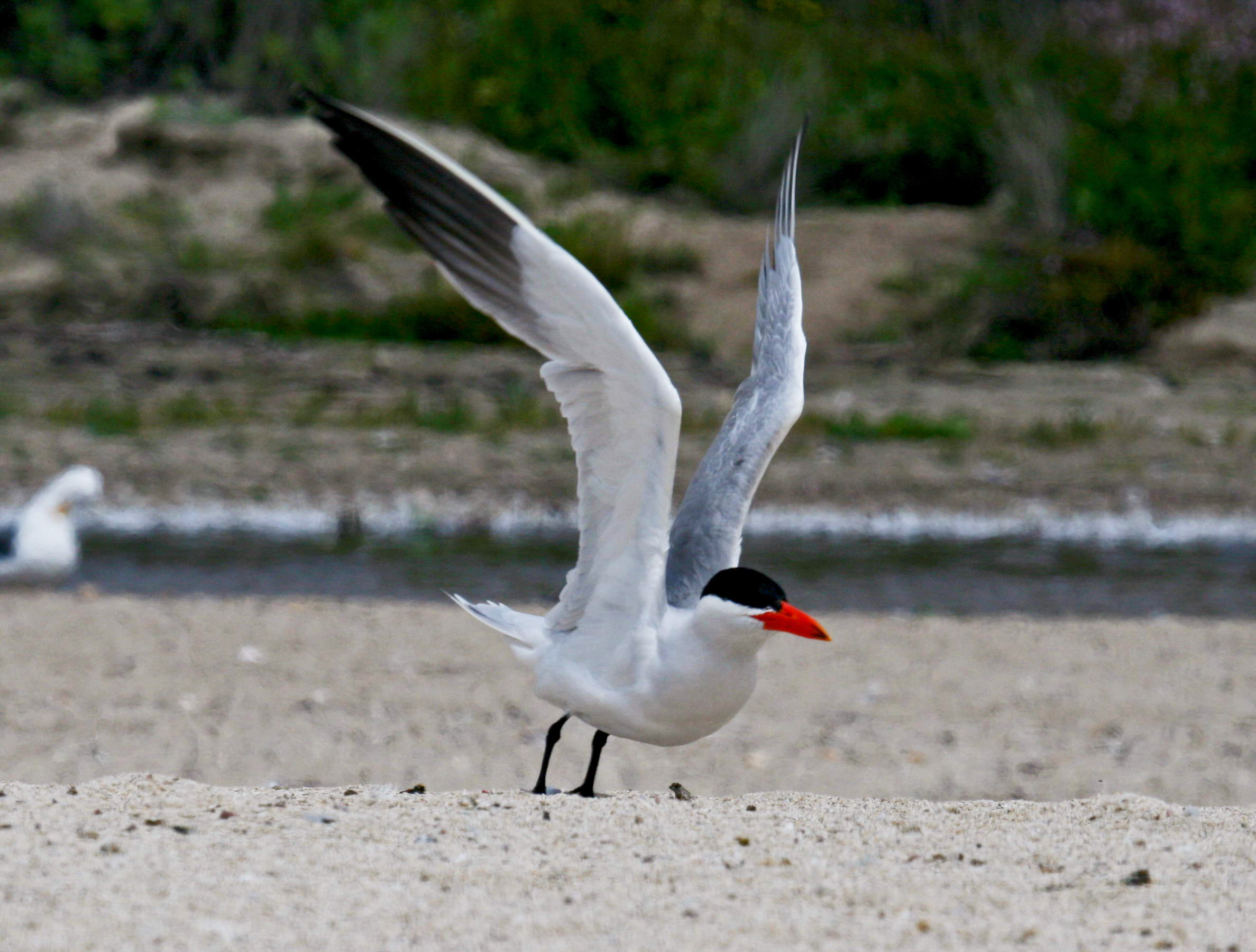
Preparing for takeoff

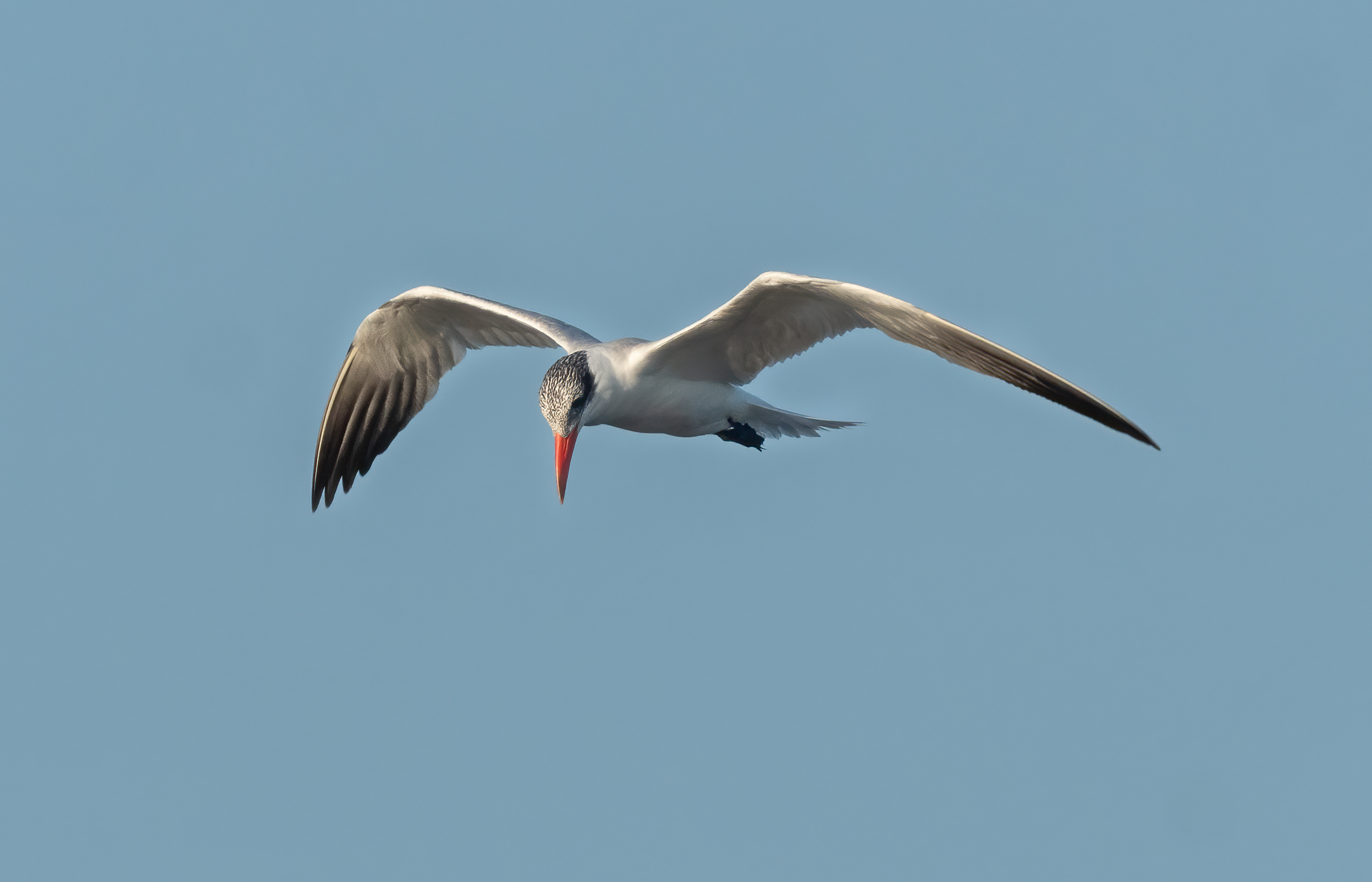
Caspian tern in flight

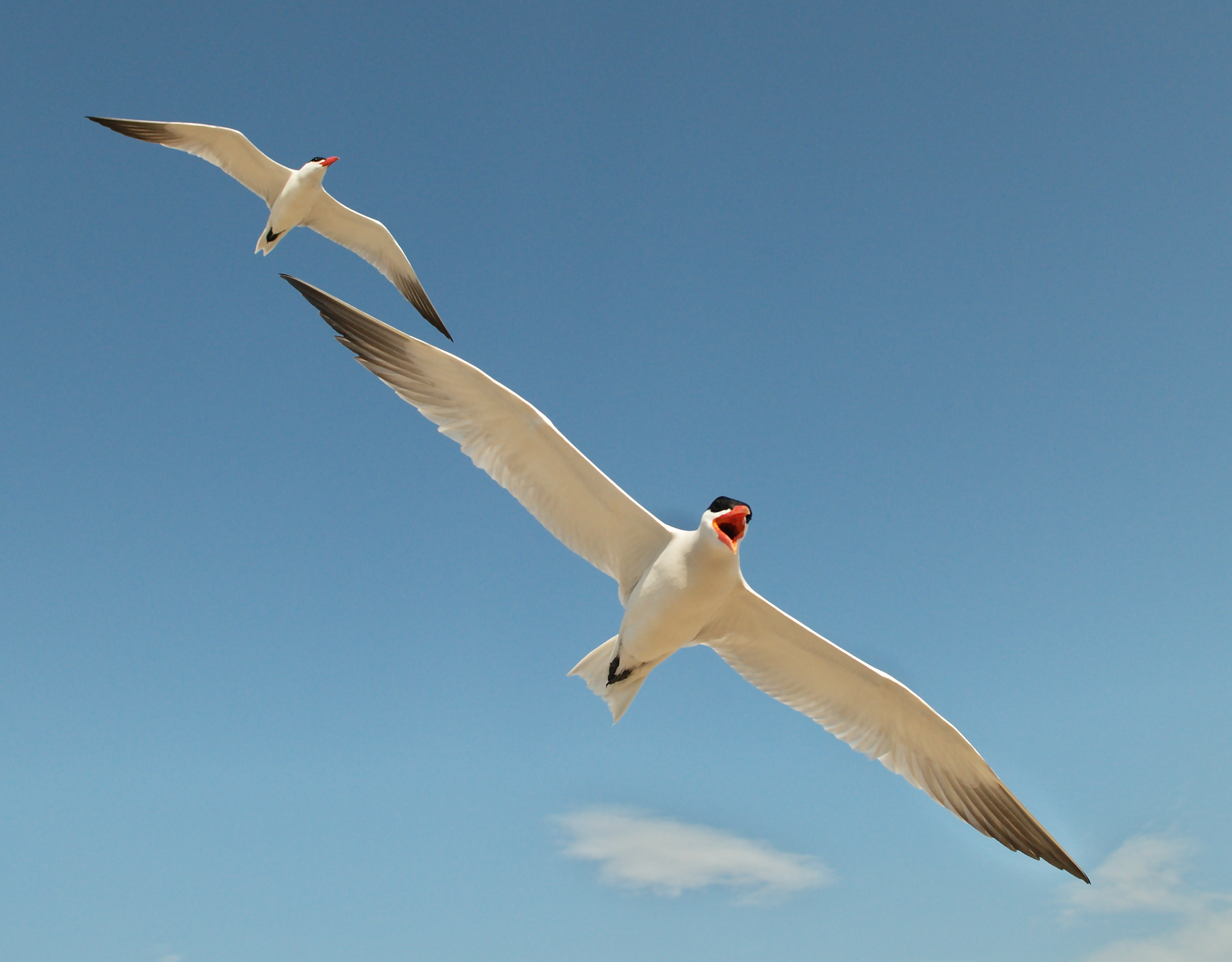
Two Caspian terns in flight

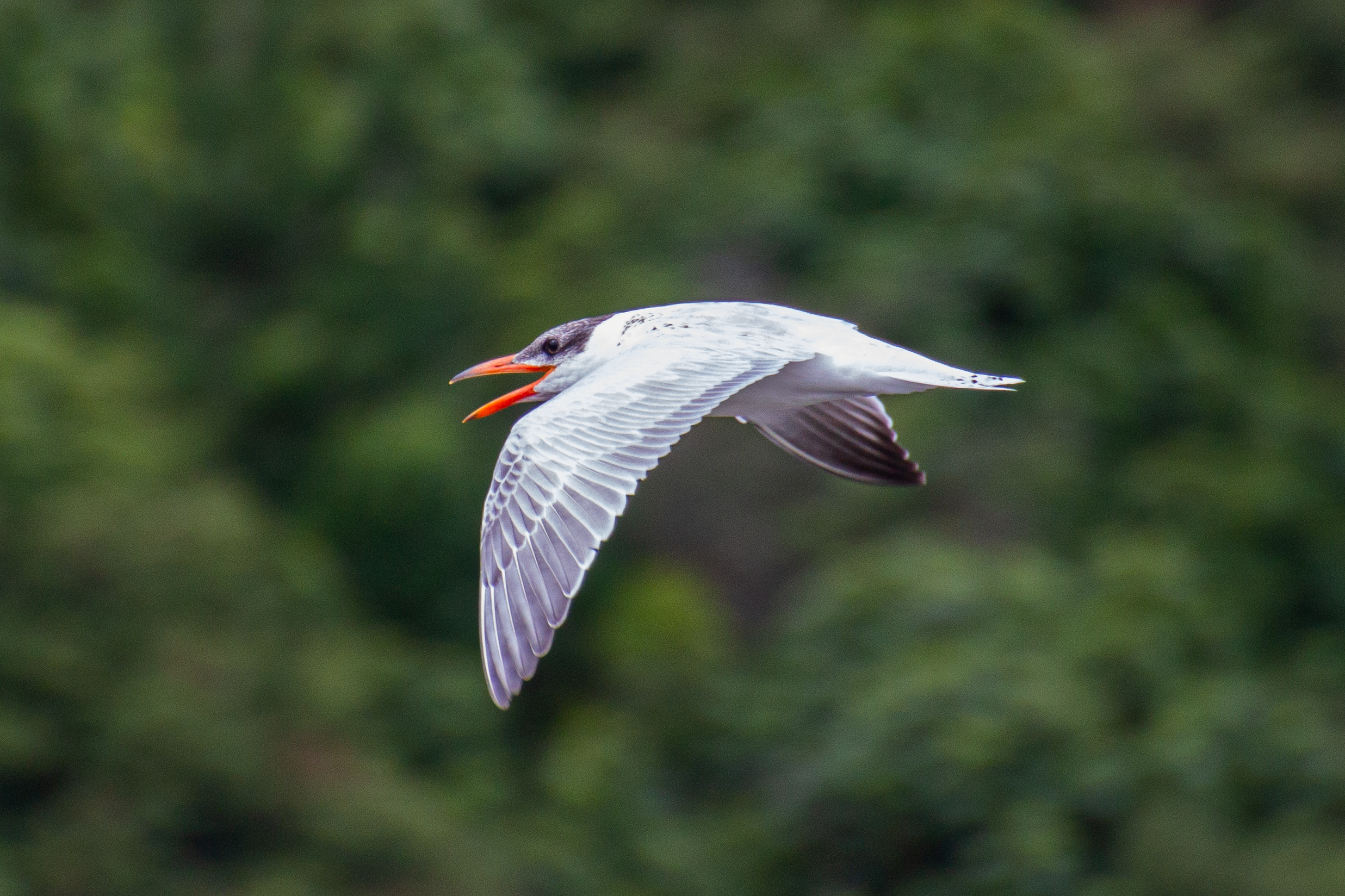
In flight In New Zealand

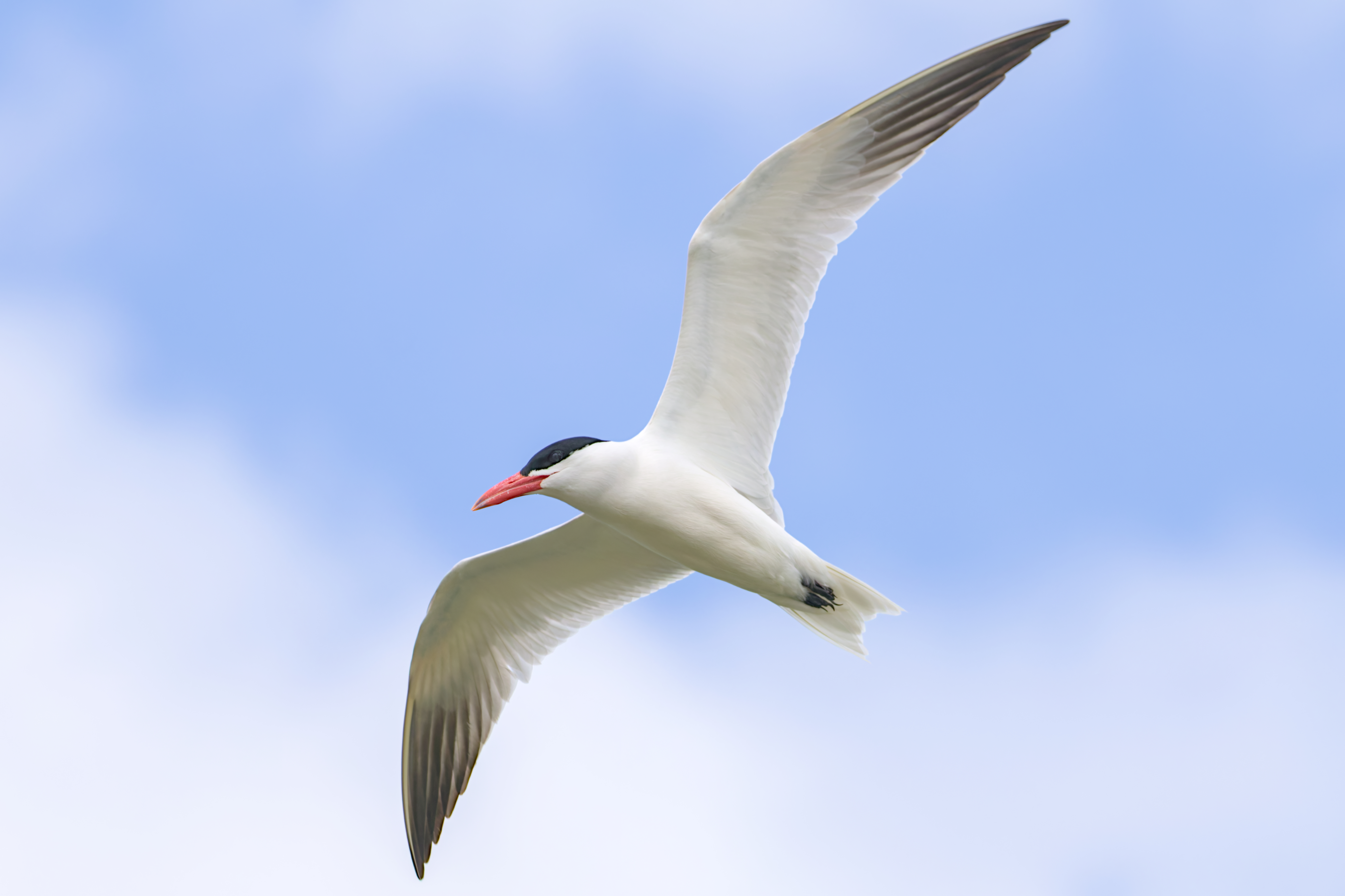
Adult in flight in Chicago
