= Old Whaling site =

The Old Whaling site is an archaeological site located within Cape Krusenstern National Monument in Alaska. It is the only known site attributed to the Old Whaling culture. The site consists of five semi-subterranean winter houses roughly 100 meters away from five above-ground summer houses. The site's inhabitation dates to roughly 3000 years ago.

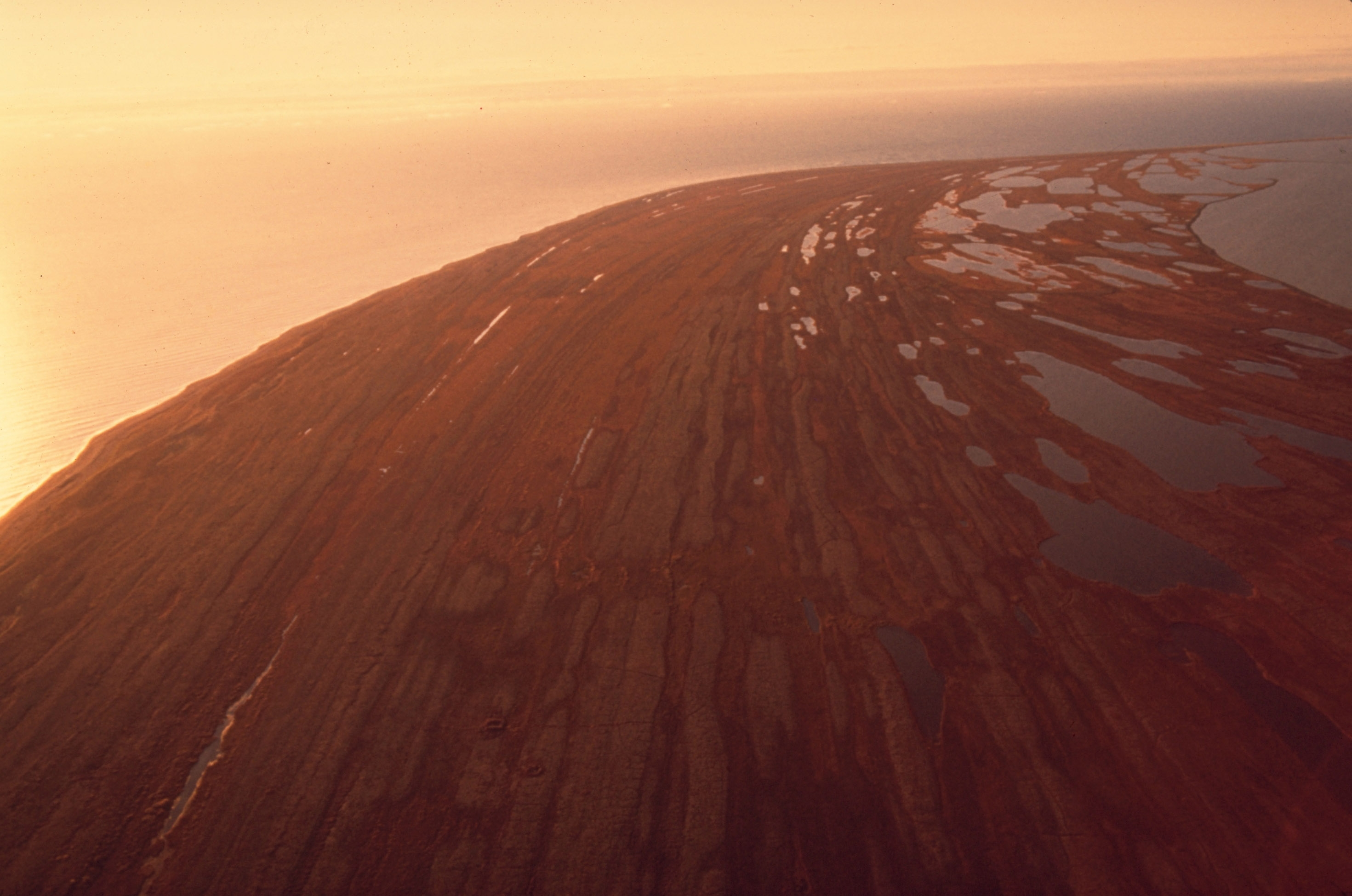
Beach Ridges on the Shore of Cape Krusenstern

It is unknown who the inhabitants of the site were or what caused the site to be abandoned. James L. Giddings stated that:

The Old Whalers are the mysterious people of Cape Krusenstern. They appeared suddenly at the cape, lived there during the early Choris period, and then disappeared [...] the Old Whaling culture is an enigma in the prehistoric record of the Arctic.

— Seven Discoveries of Bering Strait

The initial excavations found scatterings of whalebones, including a baleen whale cranium, and large stone tools, assumed to be used for processing hunted whales. The inhabitants of the site used vertebrae within their houses, possibly as a form of furniture. Whalebone furniture re-emerged around 800 AD in the whaling Thule people. Since the large tools and emphasis on whales were out of keeping with known cultures, it was concluded that the site reflected an undiscovered culture who practiced whaling before other cultures of the Arctic leading to the controversial naming of the site. Some modern scholars contend that the site reflects scavenging from beached whales. A 2003 archaeological field investigation of the site theorized that the site was likely inhabited three distinct times by a group of people who lived and hunted across the landscape.
