= Cape Krusenstern National Monument =

U.S. National Monument and National Historic Landmark

- IUCN category V (protected landscape/seascape)
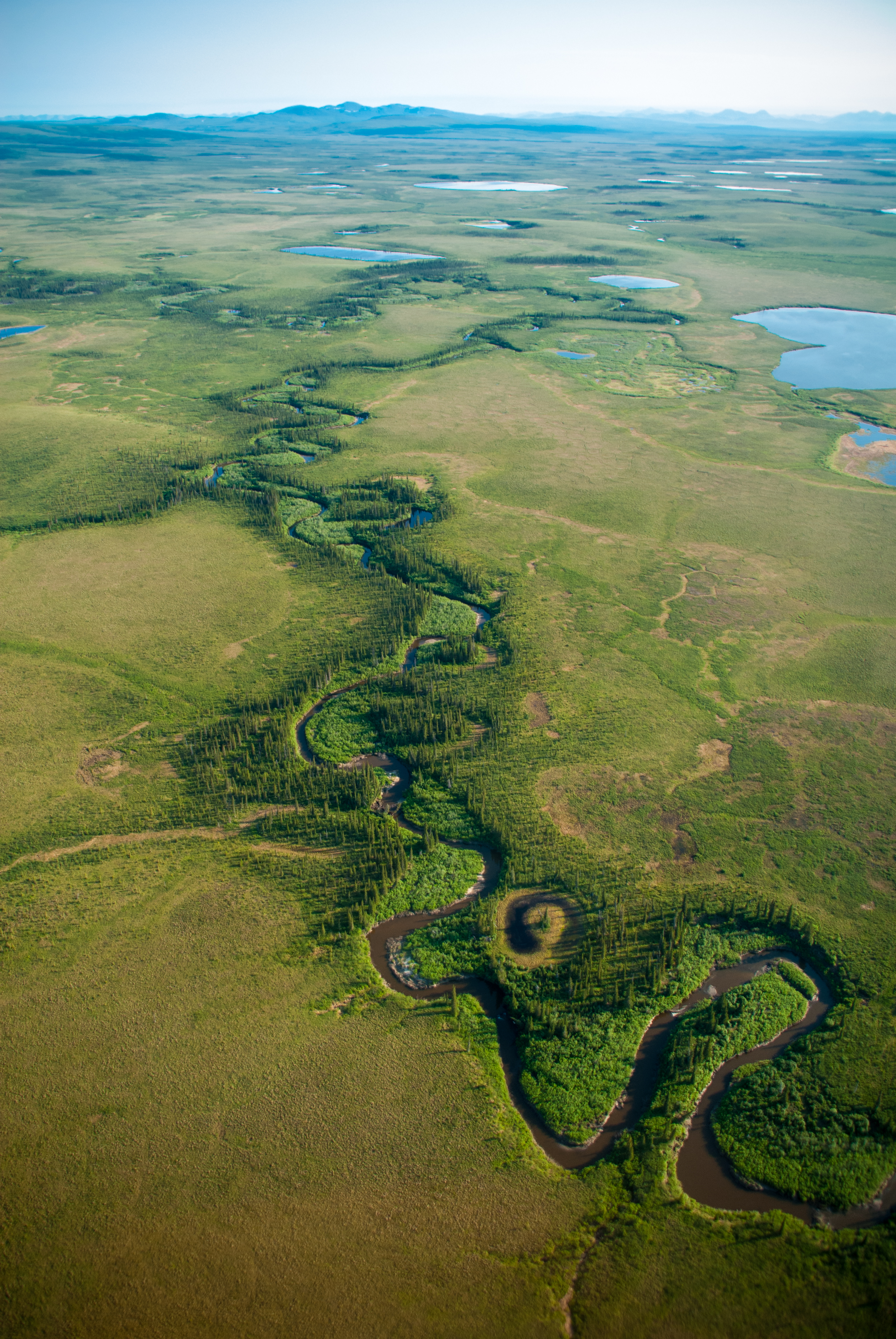

- Location within Alaska
- Interactive map of Cape Krusenstern National Monument
- Location: Northwest Arctic Borough, Alaska, United States
- Nearest city: Kotzebue, Alaska
- Coordinates: 67°20′N 163°35′W
- Area: 649,082 acres (2,626.74 km^{2})
- Created: December 2, 1980
- Visitors: 17,736 (in 2024)
- Governing body: National Park Service
- Website: Cape Krusenstern National Monument
- Cape Krusenstern Archeological District National Monument
- U.S. National Register of Historic Places
- U.S. National Historic Landmark
- Alaska Heritage Resources Survey
- Location: Address restricted
- Nearest city: Kotzebue, Alaska
- NRHP reference No.: 73000378
- AHRS No.: NOA-042

Significant dates
- Added to NRHP: November 7, 1973
- Designated NHL: November 7, 1973

Cape Krusenstern National Monument and the colocated Cape Krusenstern Archeological District is a U.S. National Monument and a National Historic Landmark centered on Cape Krusenstern in northwestern Alaska. The national monument was one of fifteen new National Park Service units designated by the Alaska National Interest Lands Conservation Act (ANILCA) of 1980. It was initially declared a national monument under the authority of the Antiquities Act by President Jimmy Carter on December 1, 1978.

Cape Krusenstern is primarily a coastal plain, containing large lagoons and rolling hills of limestone. The bluffs record thousands of years of change in the shorelines of the Chukchi Sea, as well as evidence of some 9,000 years of human habitation. The park's central features, 114 beach ridges at the eponymous cape, alternate between sandy and gravelly ridges and narrow ponds. Located entirely above the Arctic Circle in a region of permafrost, the monument's lands include typical thermokarst features.

== Description ==
Cape Krusenstern National Monument comprises the coast of the Chukchi Sea from the opening of the Hotham Inlet at the mouth of the Kobuk River, extending northwards along the coast to a point just short of Imikruk Lagoon. It extends inland about 20 miles (32 km), with a high point in the north at Kikmiksot Mountain (2,285 feet (696 m)) in the Mulgrave Hills and in the south at Mount Noak (2,010 feet (610 m)) in the Igichuk Hills. The coastline is marked by a series of lagoons separated from the sea by sandspits. The largest is the Krusenstern Lagoon at Cape Krusenstern. Others include the Kotlik, Imik and Aukulak Lagoons.

The local bedrock is composed of limestone, dolomite, phyllite and chert from the Precambrian through Devonian times. The land was glaciated during the Illinoian glaciation, but was free of permanent ice during the Wisconsonian glaciation. Longshore currents have deposited beach ridges since then for 6,000 years.

=== Archaeological district ===
The archeological district comprises 114 ancient beach ridges which formed approximately 60 years apart. They provide a sequential look at over 5000 years of habitation. The area in the National Historic Landmark is vast, making this one of the largest NHLs in the U.S., along with the Adirondack Park. The national historic landmark was designated on November 7, 1973.

The beach ridges are the primary reason for the area's preservation, which serves to safeguard evidence of 5,000 years of occupation by the Inupiat people, and more than 9,000 years of human occupation. Initial investigations by archaeologist J. Louis Giddings in the late 1940s found campsites on the cape as much as 4,000 years old, and even older sites on the mainland. University of Washington researchers have undertaken several years of excavations to document about one third of the 9,000-acre (3,600 ha) beach complex. Researchers found campsites, hearths and animal bones, with a few stone tools and pieces of pottery. In newer locations the team documented the remains of semi-subterranean houses built into the beach ridges, such as the Old Whaling site.

The oldest mainland sites such as Battle Rock, Rabbit Mountain and the Lower Bench date to the Paleo-Arctic tradition, about 10,000 to 7,000 years before present. Similar materials have been recovered in the Trail Creek caves of Bering Land Bridge National Preserve on the Seward Peninsula. The Palisades site has yielded materials from the Northern Archaic period dating to about 6,000 years before the present. Later periods described in the region include the Arctic Small Tool tradition and the Northern Maritime tradition. The western Thule culture, which used dogs and seal oil extended from 950 AD to 1400, and was succeeded by the Kotzebue culture from about 1400 to about 1850, when Europeans began to affect native cultures. Kotzebue sites are widespread within the monument.

=== Later history ===
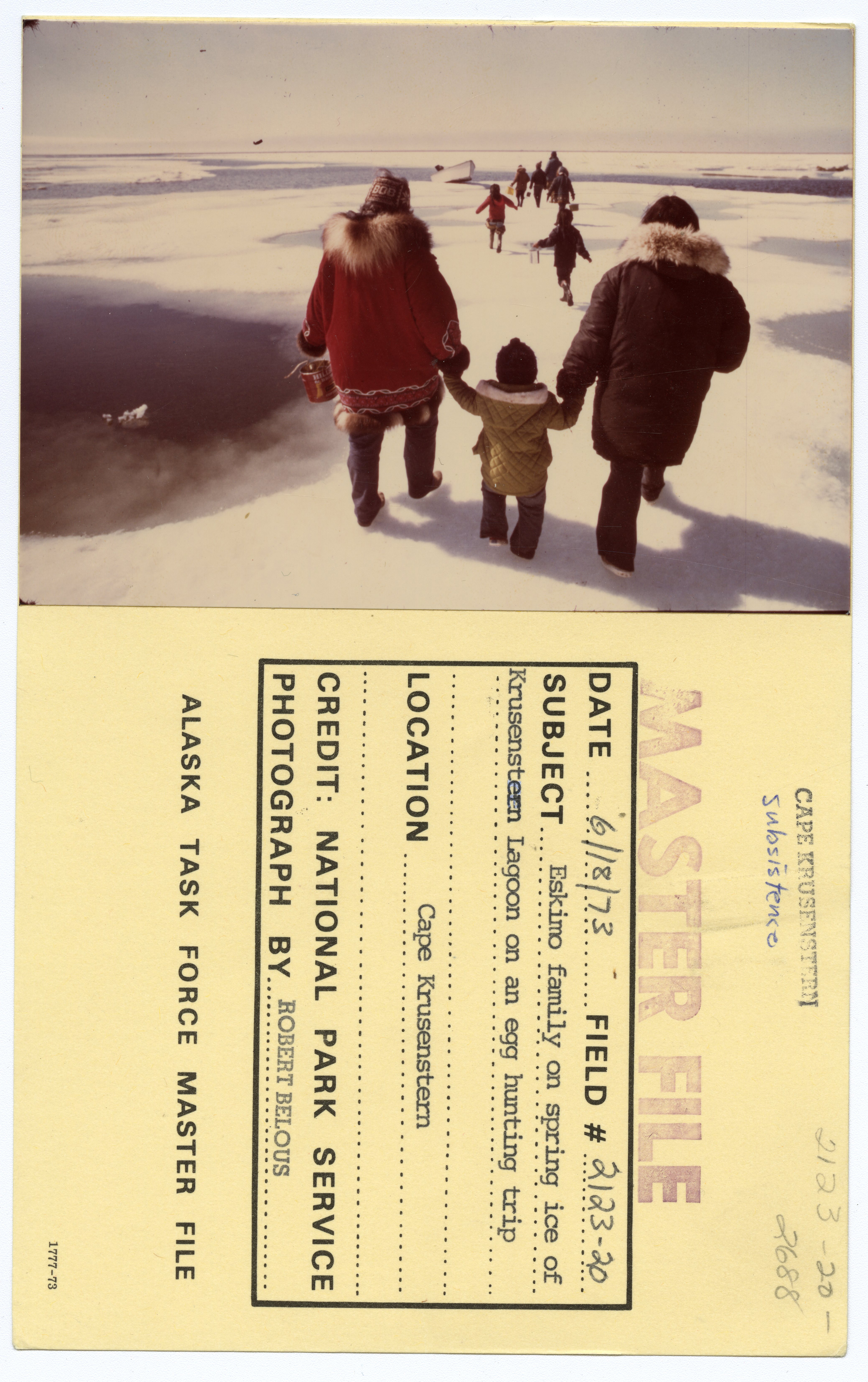
Family on spring ice of Krusenstern Lagoon on an egg hunting trip, 1973

Europeans visited the Cape Krusenstern region to pursue whales beginning in the 1850s. During the American Civil War the Confederate raider CSS Shenandoah captured whalers in the area.

In early modern times the Kotzebue area was the site of Qatnut, a kind of trade fair for the region's native people. Qatnut is still celebrated in modern times in the city of Kotzebue, Alaska every other summer. A short-lived gold rush brought prospectors to the Seward Peninsula and Kotzebue in the 1890s. A few 20th-century structures exist in the monument, including an Alaska Road Commission cabin at Anigaaq that has been evaluated for historic significance. In the 1950s the area's lack of good natural harbors, a desire to develop the Alaskan frontier facing the Soviet Union and the Operation Plowshare drive for the peaceful use of nuclear weapons brought proposals for Operation Chariot, a proposed deepwater harbor at Cape Thompson 50 miles (80 km) northwest of the monument, to be excavated using nuclear devices. The project, though popular elsewhere in Alaska, was opposed by native leaders and was discarded.

== Ecology and environment ==
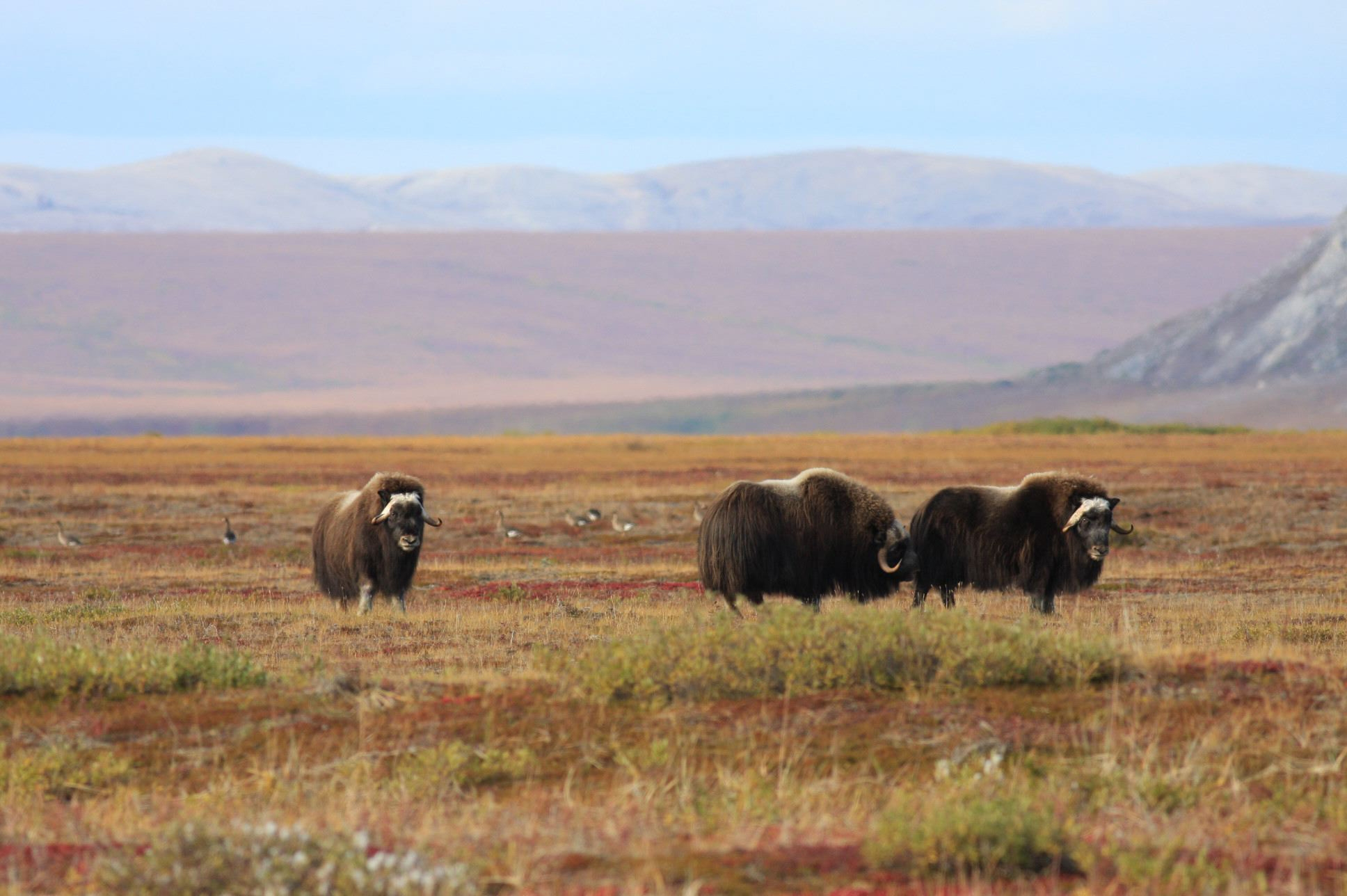
Muskoxen at Cape Krusenstern

The lands within the monument, which lies entirely above the Arctic Circle, are all tundra in which the permafrost dominates soils and vegetation. The monument is in a permafrost region. In the lowland areas the land is shaped by thermokarst forces. Typical thermokarst features seen in the monument include pingos, polygon ice wedges and thaw ponds. Low vegetation covers the land, mainly in tussocks of cottongrass, with shrubby growth of willow, Labrador tea, dwarf birch, mountain alder and other species in moist tundra areas. Wetter areas in the southern part of the monument feature grasses and sedges. Upland regions are Arctic tundra, with lichen, saxifrage, willow and heather. Few trees grow, and the white spruce that do grow are confined to the southeastern corner of the monument.

The coastal region supports a variety of large terrestrial and marine mammals. The abundant caribou are part of the West. Large predators include brown bears and wolf packs. Smaller mammals include snowshoe and Arctic hares, weasels, minks, otters, porcupines and a few wolverines. Marine mammals in or near monument waters include fin, bowhead, gray and beluga whales. Seal species include ringed, spotted, bearded and ribbon seals, with occasional walruses. Ringed seals are hunted by native subsistence hunters, and occasionally beluga whales and walrus are hunted as well.

Fish species include five species of salmon, burbot, several species of whitefish, Arctic char, Dolly Varden trout, herring and northern pike.

Water birds of all kinds nest in the monument. Nesting species include tundra swan, mallard, green-winged teal, common eider, Canada goose, and horned and red-necked grebes. Sandhill cranes also nest on the tundra, with common, Arctic and yellow-billed loons. Seabirds include glaucous gulls, Arctic terns, long-tailed jaegers and common murres. Landbirds include willow and rock ptarmigans. Predatory landbirds include peregrine falcons, snowy owls and goshawks. Endangered species at Cape Krusenstern include the possibly extinct Eskimo curlew, and threatened spectacled eider and Steller's eider.

Weather in the coastal monument is subject to extremes. Average low temperatures in January are 5 °F (−15 °C), and can reach nighttime lows of −50 °F (−46 °C). Summer temperatures average around 55 °F (13 °C), and can reach 70 °F (21 °C). Since the park is above the Arctic Circle, the sun does not set from June 3 to July 9, and the sun is visible for only 1 1/2 hours on the winter solstice, with long periods of twilight on either side of sunrise and sunset. As is the case over all of northern Alaska, the aurora borealis is often visible on winter nights when solar activity is high. Snow can happen at any time of the year. The coast can be stormy, with winds of 50 miles per hour (80 km/h) to 70 miles per hour (110 km/h). Visitors must take care against hypothermia in the cool, damp environment.

=== Mining ===
The Red Dog mine is the world's largest zinc mine. The mine opened in 1989, located about 30 miles (48 km) northeast of the monument, close to Noatak National Preserve on land owned by the NANA Regional Corporation, an Alaskan native corporation. The mine is operated by Teck Cominco Alaska. A haul road from the mine crosses monument lands to a small port facility on the monument's shore a few miles south of the northern boundary, from which the concentrated lead and zinc powder is shipped during the 100 ice-free days of the year. About 20 miles (32 km) of the 55-mile (89 km) road are within the monument. A 2006 study measured high lead and cadmium concentrations in voles and birds sampled near the road compared to those at a control location. The animal sample was a follow-up to an earlier study that found elevated lead and cadmium levels in mosses near the road. The contamination is attributed to dust blown from trucks on the haul road. Following the first study changes were made to the trucks to contain dust and a sampling program was put into effect to monitor dust release.

== History and administration ==
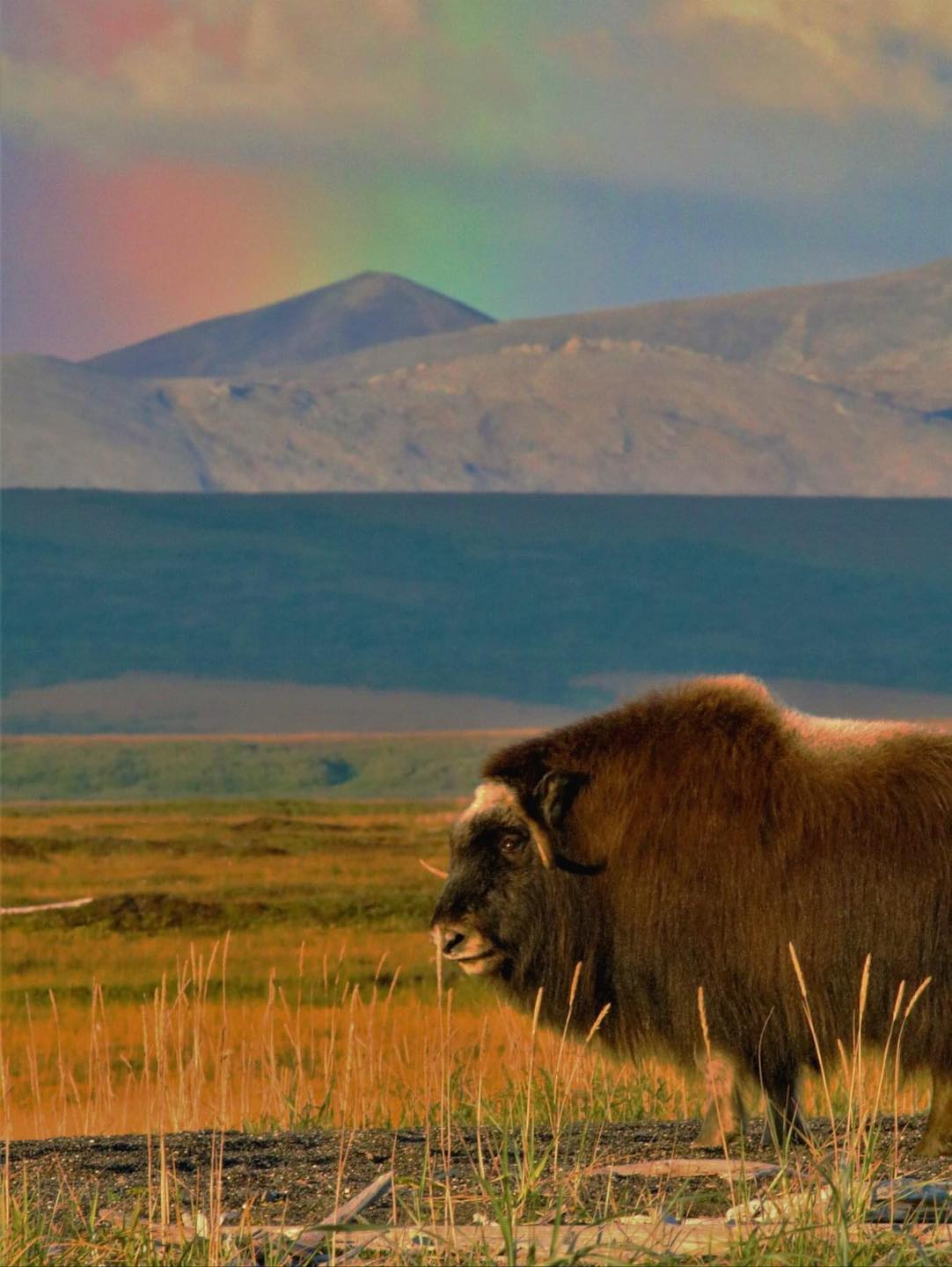
Muskoxen with rainbow

Cape Krusenstern National Monument was established as one of fifteen new National Park Service properties established by the Alaska National Interest Lands Conservation Act (ANILCA) of 1980. It was first declared a national monument by President Jimmy Carter on December 1, 1978 using his authority under the Antiquities Act when Congressional negotiations on the proposed ANILCA bill were stalled. ANILCA was finally passed in 1980, and signed by Carter on December 2, 1980. As is the case in most national park lands in Alaska, subsistence hunting by local residents is permitted. No part of the monument is designated as a national preserve, which would allow sport hunting. About 19% of monument lands are owned by native corporations.

The monument's headquarters are at the Northwest Arctic Heritage Center in Kotzebue, across the Hotham Inlet from Cape Krusenstern. Offices and visitor services for Kobuk Valley National Park and Noatak National Preserve are in the same facility. The units are managed together as the Western Arctic National Parklands, with a single Park Service superintendent in charge.

== See also ==
- List of National Historic Landmarks in Alaska
- List of national monuments of the United States
- National Register of Historic Places listings in Northwest Arctic Borough, Alaska

== Bibliography ==
- Giddings, J. Louis and Douglas D. Anderson (1986). Beach Ridge Archeology of Cape Krusenstern: Eskimo and Pre-Eskimo Settlements around Kotzebue Sound, Alaska Publications in Archeology vol 20. Washington D.C.: National Park Service.
