= Western Arctic National Parklands =

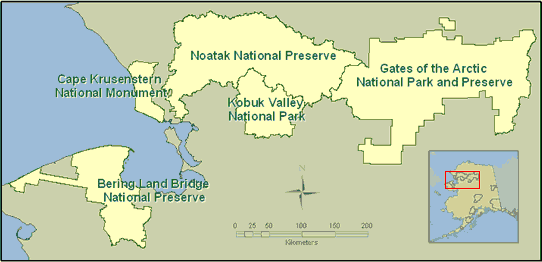
The Western Arctic National Parklands in Alaska (Gates of the Arctic is contiguous, but separately managed)

The Western Arctic National Parklands describes four United States National Park Service units in western Alaska that are managed by a single park superintendent and their staff. The western Arctic parklands are Kobuk Valley National Park, Noatak National Preserve, Cape Krusenstern National Monument, and Bering Land Bridge National Preserve. The four units have a total area of about 11,000,000 acres (4,500,000 ha) and are managed from the Northwest Arctic Heritage Center in Kotzebue, Alaska. Bering Land Bridge National Preserve has administrative offices in Nome.
