= Noatak National Preserve =

National Preserve along the Noatak River in northwestern Alaska

- IUCN category V (protected landscape/seascape)
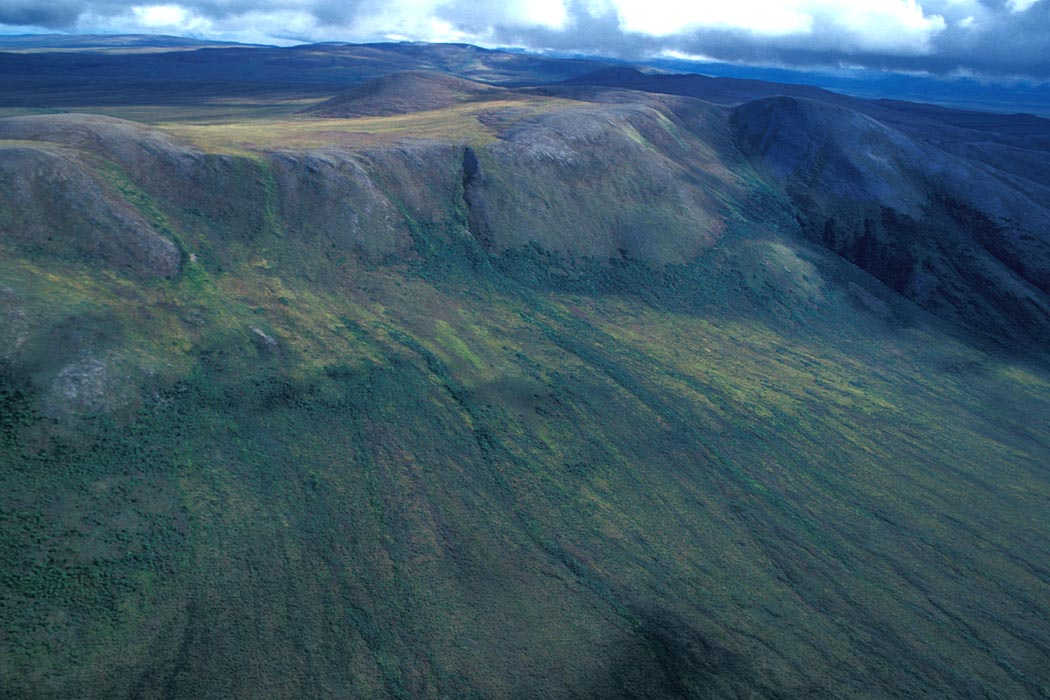
- High alpine tundra, Noatak National Preserve (2009)

- Location within Alaska
- Location: Northwest Arctic Borough and North Slope Borough, Alaska, US
- Nearest city: Kotzebue, Alaska
- Coordinates: 68°00′N 159°30′W
- Area: 6,569,904 acres (26,587.46 km^{2})
- Established: December 1, 1978
- Visitors: 4,621 (in 2025)
- Governing body: National Park Service
- Website: Noatak National Preserve

Noatak National Preserve is a United States National Preserve in northwestern Alaska that was established to protect the Noatak River Basin. The Noatak River system, located just north of the Arctic Circle, is thought to be the last remaining complete river system in the United States that has not been altered by human activities. The roadless basin was proclaimed a United States National Monument in 1978 and a National Preserve in 1980 through the passage of the Alaska National Interest Lands Conservation Act (ANILCA). Noatak National Preserve borders Kobuk Valley National Park on the south and Gates of the Arctic National Park on the east. Unlike the national parks that it borders, sport hunting is allowed in Noatak National Preserve.

All of the preserve, except for about 700,000 acres (280,000 ha) east of the village of Noatak, has been designated the 5,765,427-acre (2,333,186 ha) Noatak Wilderness. The wilderness is the fourth-largest in the United States, following the Wrangell-Saint Elias Wilderness, the Mollie Beattie Wilderness, and the Gates of the Arctic Wilderness.

== Ecology and geology ==
The preserve includes the transition zone from boreal forest to tundra near the southern edge of the preserve. The Noatak Basin is a transition zone for plants and animals between Arctic and subarctic environments. The lower portion of the Noatak valley has areas of boreal forest, but most vegetation is low-growing tundra species. Alpine tundra occurs at high elevation, and moist tundra, the most common condition, supports cottongrass, willows, Labrador tea, mountain alder, dwarf birch and other tundra species at lower elevations. Boggy areas support cranberry, bog rosemary and salmonberry.

Wildlife of the Noatak tundra includes Alaskan moose, grizzly bears, black bears, wolf packs, Arctic foxes, lemmings, Dall's sheep, vast herds of caribou numbering more than 230,000 individuals, and a variety of birds. Larger birds include Canada geese, tundra swans, white-fronted geese and common, Arctic, yellow-billed and Pacific loons. Predatory birds include rough-legged hawks, gyrfalcons and golden eagles.

The central feature of the preserve is the Noatak River, and is a breeding ground for a variety of commercially important fish. The most widespread salmon species is chum, and pink, chinook and sockeye salmon are found as well. Several kinds of trout are found in deep lakes, with Arctic char and Arctic grayling the most common salmonids in the preserve. Burbot are also found, as are nelma or sheefish, an important species for subsistence fisheries.

The Brooks Range has existed since Cretaceous time, and is composed mainly of shales, limestone and chert, with intrusions of igneous rocks from more recent volcanism. The valleys are composed of limestone, sandstone and siltstone, with deposits of sand, gravel, silt and clay. During the Wisconsonian glaciation the area was incompletely covered by ice, with higher regions glaciated. Permafrost exists in higher regions, becoming patchy at lower levels.

== Activities ==
Since Noatak is a national preserve, both subsistence hunting by local residents and sport hunting by outsiders are permitted in the preserve. If Noatak was a national park, only subsistence hunting would be allowed. Float trips on the Noatak River are a popular way to see the preserve. However, most trips on the Noatak River take place high on the river in Gates of the Arctic National Park, typically from Twelve Mile Creek to Lake Matcherak. Longer trips can continue through the preserve, although the lower river's braided stream presents difficulties beyond Noatak village. There are a few rapids on the river of Class II+, although most of the river is Class I or Class II. Float trip season runs from June or July, when the river thaws, to September. Biting insects are most prevalent in June and July.

== Geography ==
The 6,569,904-acre (2,658,746 ha) preserve extends westward from Gates of the Arctic National Park along the Brooks Range to the north and the Baird Mountains to the south, enclosing the valley of the Noatak River. It is bordered to the north by the National Petroleum Reserve–Alaska. The lower valley of the Noatak is not part of the preserve, separating the preserve from Cape Krusenstern National Monument on the coast. The southeast corner of the preserve runs almost to the coastline at Hotham Inlet. The distance from the headwaters in Gates of the Arctic National Park to Noatak, Alaska is about 354 miles (570 km). Land ownership within the preserve is mostly federal, with 289,973 acres (117,348 ha) owned by native corporations or under easements.

The entire preserve is above the Arctic Circle. Summer weather can have high temperatures of 70 to 80 °F (21 to 27 °C), although snow can occur at any time. The climate is more maritime and temperate on the western side of the park, with harsher, more extreme conditions in the east.

== History ==
=== Human occupation ===
Archaeological investigations of the Noatak Valley have found artifacts at sites mostly outside of the preserve. Relatively little has been found within the preserve boundaries. A site just outside the preserve has been dated to 11,700 years before present. Discoveries at Bering Land Bridge National Preserve imply human occupation as far back as 13,000 years ago. Similar extrapolation from sites at Cape Krusenstern and at Onion Portage in the Kobuk Valley imply occupation in later times. In historical times the Naupaktomiut portion of the Inupiat people lived in the lower Noatak valley and the Noatagmuit occupied the middle and upper valley. Hunters from the area of Kotzebue and the Kobuk valley visited the Noatak valley as well. Archaeological remains indicate the presence of villages at lake shores in the preserve during the 1600s, which are believed to have been disrupted by disease-induced population decline brought about by contact with Europeans. The lower Noatak was first explored in 1850 by men from the British survey ship HMS Plover. More surveys took place in 1885. Prospectors arrived in 1898 as a consequence of the Klondike gold rush. In the early 1900s nearly all of the remaining people in the valley concentrated at Noatak.

=== Administration and designations ===
Noatak National Monument was proclaimed on December 1, 1978 by President Jimmy Carter using his authority under the Antiquities Act. Carter took the action after the Alaska National Interest Lands Conservation Act (ANILCA) was held up in Congress. In 1980 ANILCA was passed, and was signed into law by Carter on December 2, 1980, converting the monument into a national preserve. No roads enter the preserve. Access is solely by air, boat or walking.

The preserve's headquarters are at the Northwest Arctic Heritage Center in Kotzebue to the west of the park on the Bering Sea coast. Offices and visitor services for Cape Krusenstern National Monument and Kobuk Valley National Park are in the same facility. The units are managed together as the Western Arctic National Parklands, with a single Park Service superintendent in charge.

A 3,035,200-hectare (7,500,000-acre) portion of the Noatak valley was designated a World Biosphere Reserve in 1976, prior to the preserve's establishment, and was withdrawn from the program in June 2017. 330 miles (530 km) of the Noatak, from its source in Gates of the Arctic National Park to the Kelly River in the Noatak National Preserve, were designated a National Wild and Scenic River as part of the ANILCA legislation.
