= Noatak River =

River in the northwestern Alaska

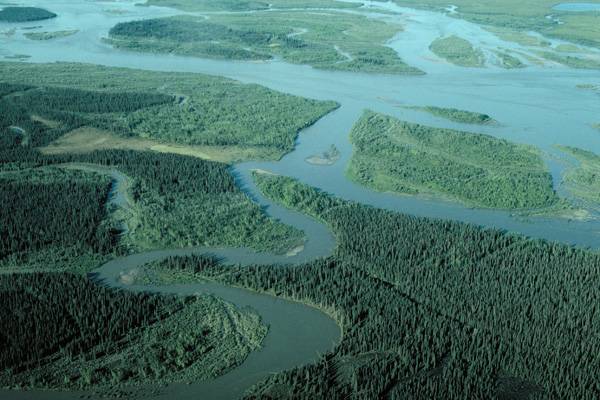
- Near the river mouth south of Noatak

- Location of the mouth of the Noatak River in Alaska
- Native name: Nuataam Kuuŋa (Inupiaq)

Location
- Country: United States
- State: Alaska
- District: Yukon–Koyukuk Census Area, North Slope Borough, Northwest Arctic Borough

Physical characteristics
- Source: Schwatka Mountains, Brooks Range
  - location: Gates of the Arctic National Park, Yukon–Koyukuk Census Area
  - coordinates: 67°22′44″N 154°53′37″W
  - elevation: 4,156 ft (1,267 m)
- Mouth: Hotham Inlet, Kotzebue Sound, Chukchi Sea
  - location: 7 miles (11 km) north of Kotzebue, Northwest Arctic Borough
  - coordinates: 66°58′53″N 162°30′23″W
  - elevation: 0 ft (0 m)
- Length: 425 mi (684 km)
- Basin size: 12,600 sq mi (33,000 km^{2})
- Discharge
  - average: 16,600 cu ft/s (470 m^{3}/s)

National Wild and Scenic River
- Type: Wild 330.0 miles (531.1 km)
- Designated: December 2, 1980

The Noatak River (Inupiaq: Nuataam Kuuŋa) (also Noatok, Noatuk, Nunatok, or Notoark) is a river in the northwestern part of the U.S. state of Alaska.

== Description ==
The Noatak River's headwaters are on the north flank of Mount Igikpak in the Schwatka Mountains of the Brooks Range in the Gates of the Arctic National Park. The Noatak flows generally westward for about 425 miles (684 km) to the Chukchi Sea at Kotzebue Sound.

The river's entire course is north of the Arctic Circle. Leaving Gates of the Arctic National Park the river enters the Noatak National Preserve which exactly delineates the river's watershed. The entire watershed of the Noatak River lies within these two protected areas, from the headwaters to where it leaves the Noatak National Preserve, which is a point approximately 20 river miles upstream of Noatak village and 90 river miles upstream of the river's delta in Kotzebue Sound. Even on this last part of the river most of the watershed lies within either Noatak National Preserve or Cape Krusenstern National Monument, with only the immediate river valley outside of these protected areas. The Noatak basin is the largest undisturbed watershed in the United States. The Noatak National Preserve alone encompasses 6,500,000 acres (26,000 km^{2}).

There are small inholdings of private land within the National Preserve, some of these have private cabins. The only permanent settlement along the Noatak River is the village of Noatak. The village has a 4,000-foot (1,200 m) lighted public gravel airstrip, several small stores, post office, and a school.

The Noatak is fed by a relatively large watershed: as for some other large braided Arctic rivercourses, rare severe rain events can result in temporary rapid inundation, to a depth of several feet, of normally dry river bars. There are a few small remnant glaciers in the Schwatka Mountains, their contribution to the water budget of the Noatak is negligible.

== Name origin ==
Named Inland River by surgeon John Simpson of the Royal Navy on a map he prepared in 1853, his wording appears to be a general translation of the Inuit name Nunulak, according to the United States Geological Survey. The name Nunatak could also mean "new land" or "belong to the land."

== "Wild and Scenic" designation ==
On December 2, 1980, the 330 miles (530 km) of the Noatak—from its source in Gates of the Arctic National Park to the Kelly River in the Noatak National Preserve—became part of the National Wild and Scenic Rivers System.

== See also ==
- List of rivers of Alaska
- List of National Wild and Scenic Rivers
