= Cape Krusenstern =

Cape in Alaska, United States of America

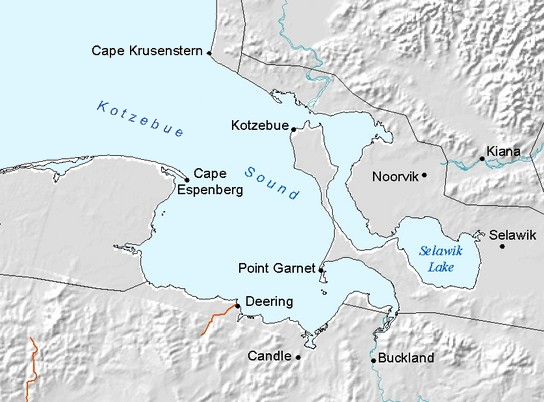
Map showing Kotzebue Sound and Cape Krusenstern

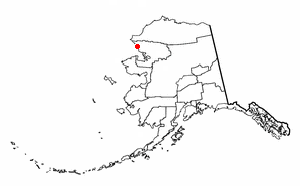
General location of Cape Krusenstern, Alaska

Cape Krusenstern (Iñupiaq: Nuvua 'its point') is a cape on the northwestern coast of the U.S. state of Alaska, located near the village of Kivalina at 67°07′41″N 163°44′43″W.

It is bounded by Kotzebue Sound to the south and the Chukchi Sea to the west, and consists of a series of beach ridges and swales with numerous ponds and lakes. The entire shoreline of the cape consists of barrier bars, lagoons and spits.

Cape Krusenstern was named for the Baltic German explorer Adam Johann von Krusenstern, who explored the area under the Russian flag.

In 1978, the area was declared the Cape Krusenstern National Monument.

Cape Krusenstern in Alaska should not be confused with the Cape Krusenstern at the west end of Coronation Gulf in northern Canada.
