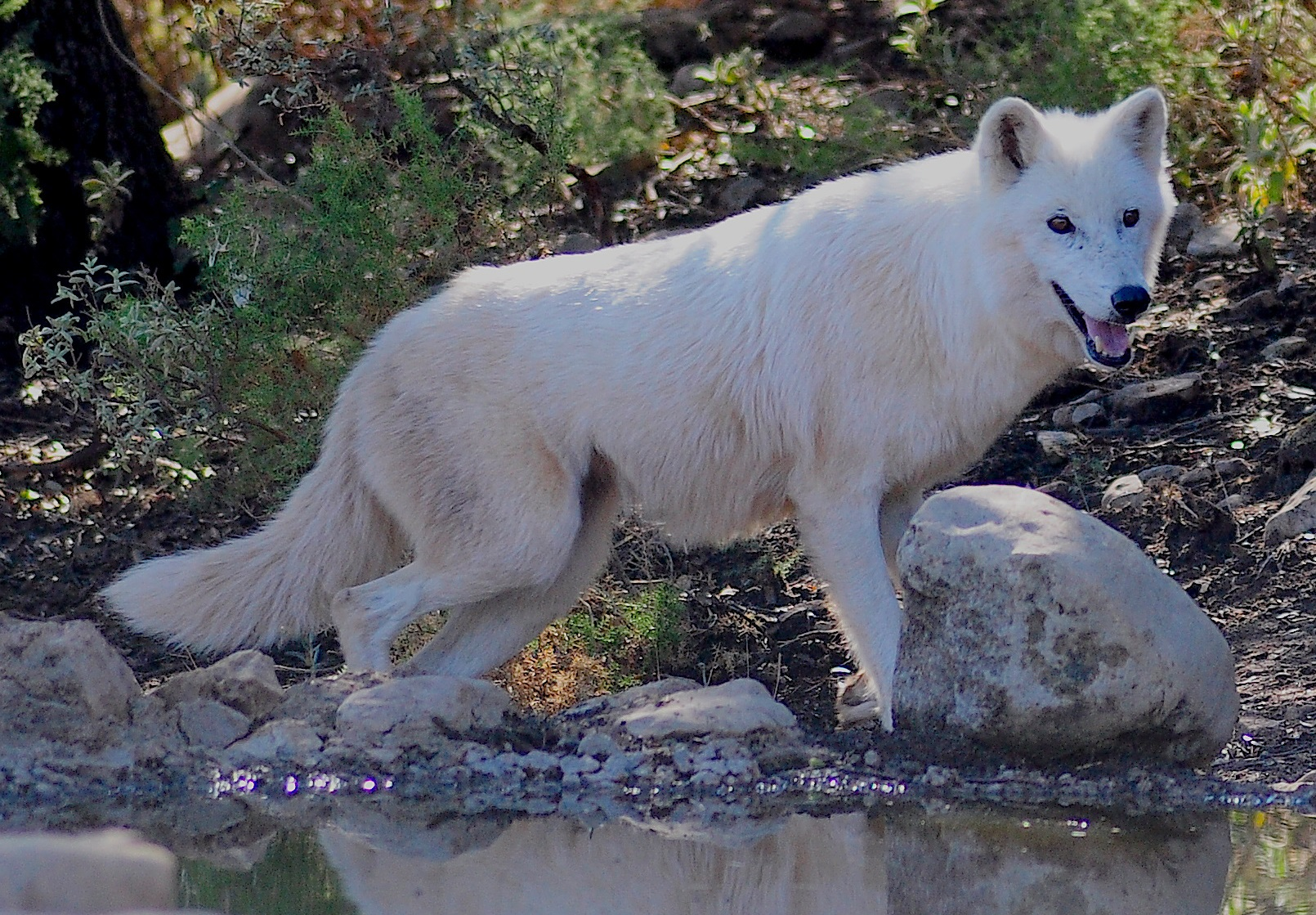
- C. l. tundrarum, Lobo Park, Antequera, Spain

Conservation status
- Apparently Secure (NatureServe)

Scientific classification
- Kingdom: Animalia
- Phylum: Chordata
- Class: Mammalia
- Order: Carnivora
- Family: Canidae
- Genus: Canis
- Species: C. lupus
- Subspecies: C. l. tundrarum

Trinomial name
- Canis lupus tundrarum Miller, 1912
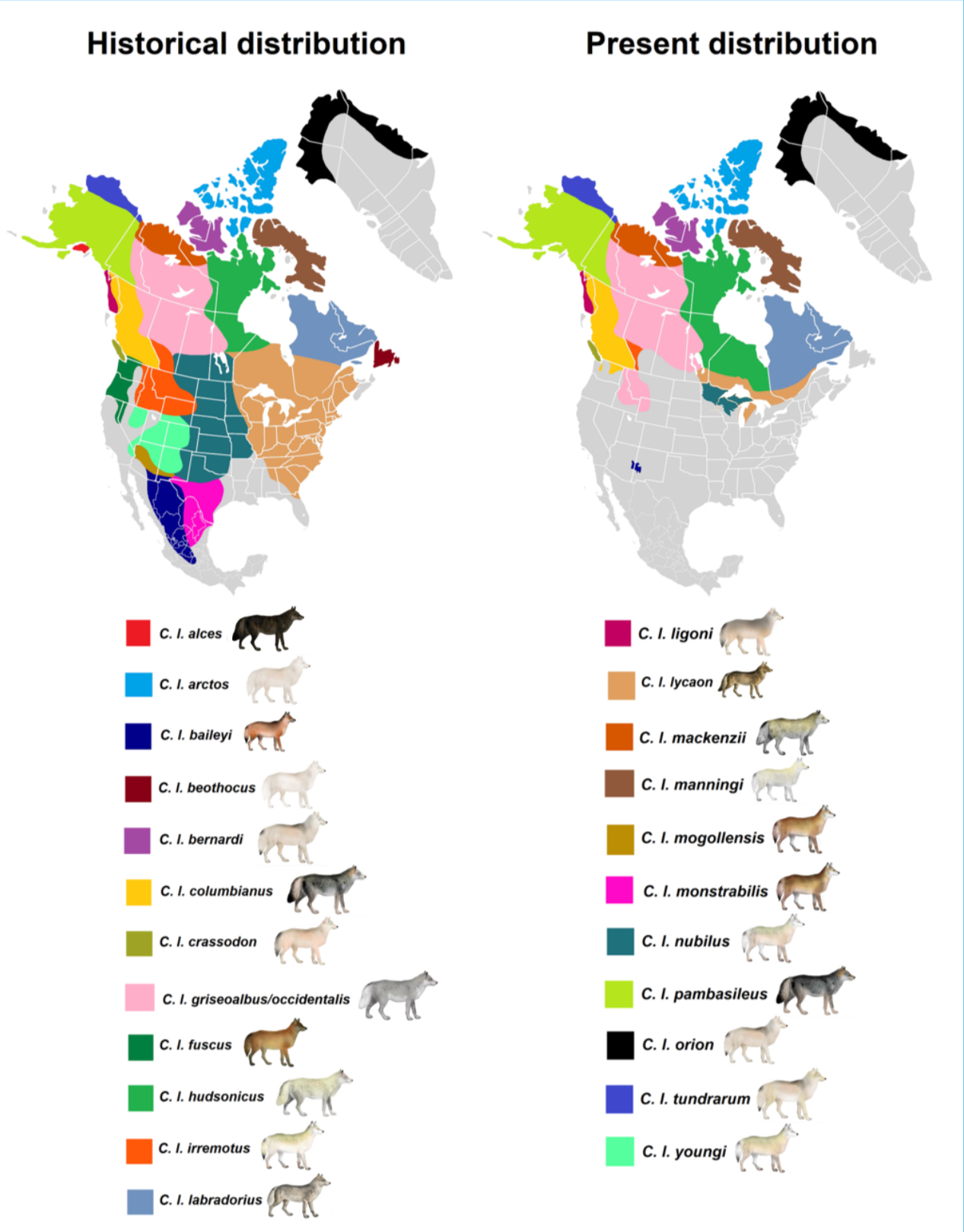
- Historical and present range of gray wolf subspecies in North America

= Alaskan tundra wolf =

Subspecies of carnivore

The Alaskan tundra wolf (Canis lupus tundrarum), also known as the Barren-ground wolf, is a North American subspecies of gray wolf native to the barren grounds of the Arctic coastal tundra region. It was named in 1912 by Gerrit Smith Miller Jr., who noted that it closely approaches the Great Plains wolf in skull and tooth morphology, though possessing a narrower rostrum and palate. It is a large, white-colored wolf closely resembling C. l. pambasileus, though lighter in color. This wolf is recognized as a subspecies of Canis lupus in the taxonomic authority Mammal Species of the World (2005).

== See also ==
- Interior Alaskan wolf
