= Alagnak River =

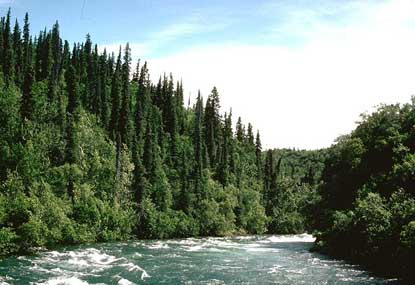
- Rapids on the Alagnak

- Location of the mouth of the Alagnak River in Alaska

Location
- Country: United States
- State: Alaska
- Borough: Lake and Peninsula

Physical characteristics
- Source: Kukaklek Lake
  - location: Katmai National Park and Preserve
  - coordinates: 59°07′53″N 155°32′39″W
  - elevation: 811 ft (247 m)
- Mouth: Kvichak River
  - location: 58 miles (93 km) east of Dillingham, Alaska Peninsula
  - coordinates: 59°00′17″N 156°51′37″W
  - elevation: 0 ft (0 m)
- Length: 64 mi (103 km)

National Wild and Scenic River
- Type: Wild
- Designated: December 2, 1980

The Alagnak River (/əˈlæɡnæk/ ə-LAG-nak) is a 64-mile (103 km) tributary of the Kvichak River in the U.S. state of Alaska. It has a catchment area of approximately 1400 square mi (3600 km^{2}). It is located in central Lake and Peninsula Borough.

== Names ==
According to the National Park Service, in the local language the word Alagnak means "making mistakes". The river course is dynamic, changing often and splitting into new branches. For this reason, it is known locally as the "Branch River", where boaters may mistake one branch for another.

On the other hand, Native American Placenames of the United States says that the river's name may come from the Yupik word alagnaq, a kind of red berry. The United States Geological Survey says something similar, citing Richard H. Geoghegan, a philologist, who said the native word referred to a wild raspberry.

== Course ==
It begins as the outflow of Kukaklek Lake in Katmai National Park and Preserve and meets the sea at Bristol Bay. The beginning of the river lies in the Aleutian Range. The first six miles of the river run slowly through the tundra. Vegetation along the upper part of the river consists mostly of spruce. Afterwards, the valley becomes much narrower with near-vertical rock faces. Miles 7–14 run through a narrow canyon at around 7.5 mph. The Nonvianuk River runs into the Alagnak at around mile 20. To the west, the river meanders over the Alaska Peninsula before flowing into the Kvichak River, which itself flows into Bristol Bay.

== Flora and fauna ==
Due to the large numbers of salmon, there is a significant bear population in the summer and fall, including both grizzly and black bears. The majority of the catchment area is a winter habitat for Alaskan caribou. Alaska moose are also to be found during the entire year. Along the river, North American beaver, red foxes, wolverines, American mink, and otter are all found as well occasional Interior Alaskan wolf. In the water, there are several varieties of salmon, including sockeye salmon, pink salmon, chum salmon, king salmon, and silver salmon. There are also rainbow trout, char, Arctic grayling, and northern pike. Along the river there is also eclectic vegetation including spruces, willows and various types of berries.

== History ==
=== Early history ===
The first humans to arrive at the Alagnak were apparently 14000 years ago, during the glacial retreat of the last ice age. The earliest documented records of humans settling there were 9000 years ago; stone tools dating from this time have been found in middens at abandoned camps near the river. Microblades known as atlatl were used from about 7000 years ago to hunt caribou by natives. The first known all-year winter villages weren't constructed until about 2300 years ago; house development and town size to contend with climate change occurred rapidly at around this time. Pottery dating from 2500 years ago has also been found.

The first white humans arrived in the 19th century, with the first white man to document the river being the Russian captain Tebenkov in 1852. At the same time, native peoples began leaving the area, with the Alagnak River village being abandoned around 1860. In 1900 the North Alaska Salmon Company built two canneries at the junction of Alagnak and Kvichak rivers. The cannery at the river mouth became known as Lockanok and the other cannery, 1000 feet upstream on the Kvichak River, was called Hallerville, in honor of J.P. Haller, president of the company. The two canneries were connected by a narrow gauge railroad that brought salmon from Hallerville to be processed at the Lockanok plant. The abundance of salmon in the rivers made this fishery one of the most prolific in Alaska. People from as far away as the Yukon River area came to get jobs at the canneries, and before long cash income allowed subsistence users to buy food store items such as coffee, tea, sugar and salt. The 1912 eruption of Mount Katmai nearby only mildly devastated the region and the Yu'pik Indians continued to keep food caches at the site.

=== Growing importance ===
In 1916 Libby, McNeill & Libby purchased both the Lockanok and Hallerville canneries from the North Alaska Salmon Company. Growing erosion around the Kvichak River banks made canning more difficult by the 1920s, and the cannery was closed in 1936 and burned down during a 1937 fire. Any remaining planks of wood from the building were taken to houses along the river and helped to create new homes for the natives.

In 1918 the Spanish flu epidemic broke out and ravaged the villages throughout June 1919, killing 39 natives and creating 16 new orphans. Despite the tragedy, villages along the river prospered due to jobs offered by the cannery. After the decimation of natives by the disease, white human settlement around the Alagnak increased rapidly. In June 1927 Russell Merrill of Anchorage Air Transport flew to the canneries at the river junction, making it the first plane to land at Bristol Bay. At the same time, big game hunting and fishing became popular at the site, and from 1937 onwards, big game hunting charters regularly flew trips to the site. When the site's rainbow trout streams were discovered, the find was a feature in the April 1941 article of Field and Stream magazine. Jay Hammond, who would later become the 4th governor of Alaska, was one of the major fishing charters in the area, first flying to it in 1946 and meeting with friend Bill Hammersley, who first came there in 1940. Beginning in 1938–1947, prospectors and beaver trappers began to regularly visit the site, as they found gold in abundance and beavers, whose fur was to become one of the most important pelts in Alaska until the collapse of the fur trade. One of the most prized big game mammals in the area was the Alaska Peninsula brown bear, which led many big game hunters in the wilderness to seek fame and fortune. Hunting and fishing lodges were established about 1957. By 1973, a galley-scow that was towed up the Alagnak from Naknek had been established.

=== Protected area ===
When nearby Katmai National Monument was established in 1921, conservationists began to consider creating a protected area around Alagnak as well. Hunters and fisherman spoke out against this, believing it would deprive them of hunting and fishing opportunities. As the legislation for Katmai National Park did not allow any hunting and fishing, the 1980 Alaska National Interest Lands Conservation Act established Alagnak Wild River to allow protection of wilderness but legal, limited sport and subsistence hunting and trapping, along with fishing. Most hunters come to Alagnak to hunt for moose to eat and grizzly bear to bag as trophies.

=== Wild River ===
In 1980, a total of 67 miles (108 km) on the upper Alagnak and one of its tributaries, the Nonvianuk River, were designated "wild" as part of the National Wild and Scenic Rivers System. The tributary, which drains Nonvianuk Lake, is 11 miles (18 km) long.

== Tourism ==
The Alagnak is one of the most important rivers for sport fishing in Alaska. The river is navigable for canoeists. In the ravine, there are rapids from levels 1 to 3. This section of the river is dangerous for inexperienced rafters, especially during highwater. Portage is possible but difficult.

== See also ==
- List of rivers of Alaska
