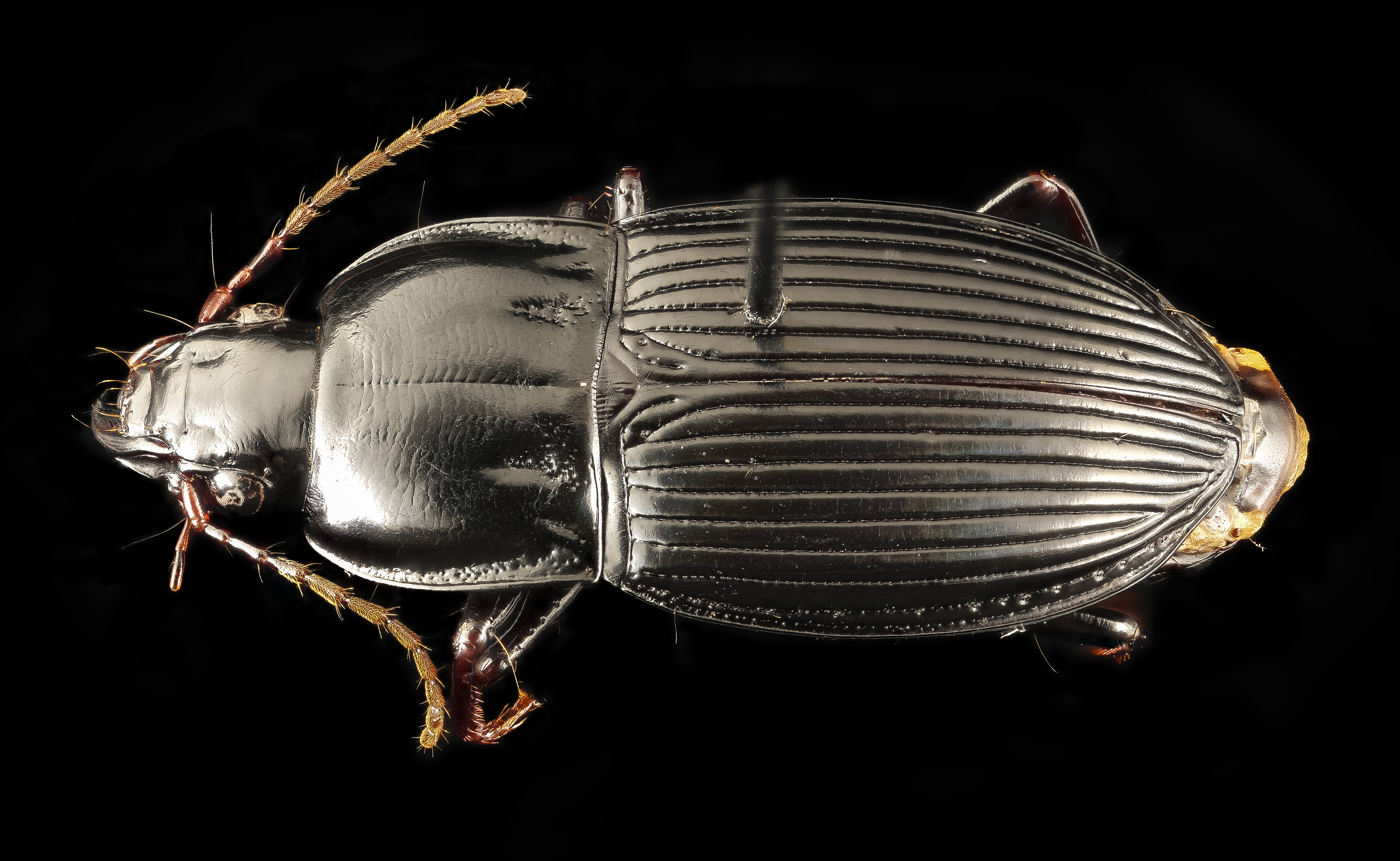

Scientific classification
- Domain: Eukaryota
- Kingdom: Animalia
- Phylum: Arthropoda
- Class: Insecta
- Order: Coleoptera
- Suborder: Adephaga
- Family: Carabidae
- Genus: Pterostichus
- Species: P. permundus

Binomial name
- Pterostichus permundus (Say, 1830)

= Pterostichus permundus =

Species of beetle

Pterostichus permundus is a species of woodland ground beetle in the family Carabidae. It is found in North America.
