= Pterostichus obesulus =

Scientific classification
- Kingdom: Animalia
- Phylum: Arthropoda
- Class: Insecta
- Order: Coleoptera
- Suborder: Adephaga
- Family: Carabidae
- Genus: Pterostichus
- Species: P. obesulus

Binomial name
- Pterostichus obesulus LeConte, 1873

Species of beetle first discovered in 1873

Pterostichus obesulus is a species of beetle first discovered in 1873. No sub-species are listed in the Catalogue of Life.
