= Pterostichus brevicornis =

Scientific classification
- Domain: Eukaryota
- Kingdom: Animalia
- Phylum: Arthropoda
- Class: Insecta
- Order: Coleoptera
- Suborder: Adephaga
- Family: Carabidae
- Genus: Pterostichus
- Species: P. brevicornis

Binomial name
- Pterostichus brevicornis (Kirby, 1837)

Species of beetle

Pterostichus brevicornis is a species of woodland ground beetle in the family Carabidae. It is found in Europe and Northern Asia (excluding China) and North America.

== Subspecies ==
These two subspecies belong to the species Pterostichus brevicornis:

- Pterostichus brevicornis brevicornis (Kirby, 1837)
- Pterostichus brevicornis yasudai Morita, 2002
