= Pterostichus trinarius =

Scientific classification
- Kingdom: Animalia
- Phylum: Arthropoda
- Class: Insecta
- Order: Coleoptera
- Suborder: Adephaga
- Family: Carabidae
- Genus: Pterostichus
- Species: P. trinarius

Binomial name
- Pterostichus trinarius (Casey, 1918)

Synonyms
- Pterostichus ohionis Csiki, 1930

Species of beetle

Pterostichus trinarius is a species of woodland ground beetle in the family Carabidae. It is found in North America.
