= Pterostichus sphodrinus =

Scientific classification
- Domain: Eukaryota
- Kingdom: Animalia
- Phylum: Arthropoda
- Class: Insecta
- Order: Coleoptera
- Suborder: Adephaga
- Family: Carabidae
- Genus: Pterostichus
- Species: P. sphodrinus

Binomial name
- Pterostichus sphodrinus Leconte, 1863

Species of beetle

Pterostichus sphodrinus is a species of woodland ground beetle in the family Carabidae. It is found in North America.
