= Pterostichus pumilus =

Scientific classification
- Kingdom: Animalia
- Phylum: Arthropoda
- Class: Insecta
- Order: Coleoptera
- Suborder: Adephaga
- Family: Carabidae
- Genus: Pterostichus
- Species: P. pumilus

Binomial name
- Pterostichus pumilus Casey, 1913

Species of beetle

Pterostichus pumilus is a species of woodland ground beetle in the family Carabidae. It is found in North America.

== Subspecies ==
These two subspecies belong to the species Pterostichus pumilus:

- Pterostichus pumilus pumilus Casey, 1913
- Pterostichus pumilus willamettensis Hacker, 1968
