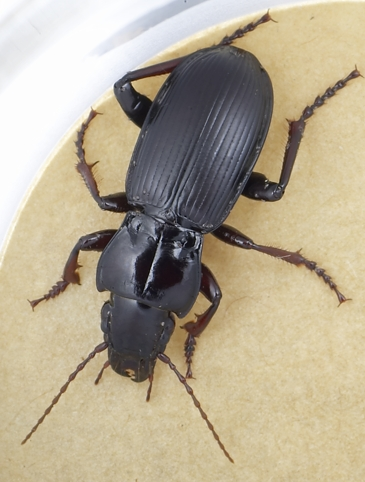

Scientific classification
- Domain: Eukaryota
- Kingdom: Animalia
- Phylum: Arthropoda
- Class: Insecta
- Order: Coleoptera
- Suborder: Adephaga
- Family: Carabidae
- Genus: Pterostichus
- Species: P. morionides

Binomial name
- Pterostichus morionides (Chaudoir, 1868)

= Pterostichus morionides =

Species of beetle

Pterostichus morionides is a species of woodland ground beetle in the family Carabidae. It is found in North America.
