= Pterostichus neobrunneus =

Scientific classification
- Kingdom: Animalia
- Phylum: Arthropoda
- Clade: Pancrustacea
- Class: Insecta
- Order: Coleoptera
- Suborder: Adephaga
- Family: Carabidae
- Genus: Pterostichus
- Species: P. neobrunneus

Binomial name
- Pterostichus neobrunneus Lindroth, 1966

Species of beetle

Pterostichus neobrunneus is a species of woodland ground beetle in the family Carabidae. It is found in North America.No subspecies are listed in the Catalogue of Life.
