= Pterostichus riparius =

Scientific classification
- Kingdom: Animalia
- Phylum: Arthropoda
- Class: Insecta
- Order: Coleoptera
- Suborder: Adephaga
- Family: Carabidae
- Genus: Pterostichus
- Species: P. riparius

Binomial name
- Pterostichus riparius (Dejean, 1828)

Species of beetle

Pterostichus riparius is a species of woodland ground beetle in the family Carabidae. It is found in North America.
