= Pterostichus menetriesii =

Scientific classification
- Kingdom: Animalia
- Phylum: Arthropoda
- Class: Insecta
- Order: Coleoptera
- Suborder: Adephaga
- Family: Carabidae
- Genus: Pterostichus
- Species: P. menetriesii

Binomial name
- Pterostichus menetriesii LeConte, 1873

Species of beetle

Pterostichus menetriesii is a species of woodland ground beetle in the family Carabidae, endemic to North America.
