= Pterostichus patruelis =

Scientific classification
- Kingdom: Animalia
- Phylum: Arthropoda
- Class: Insecta
- Order: Coleoptera
- Suborder: Adephaga
- Family: Carabidae
- Genus: Pterostichus
- Species: P. patruelis

Binomial name
- Pterostichus patruelis (Dejean, 1831)

Species of beetle

Pterostichus patruelis is a species of woodland ground beetle in the family Carabidae.
