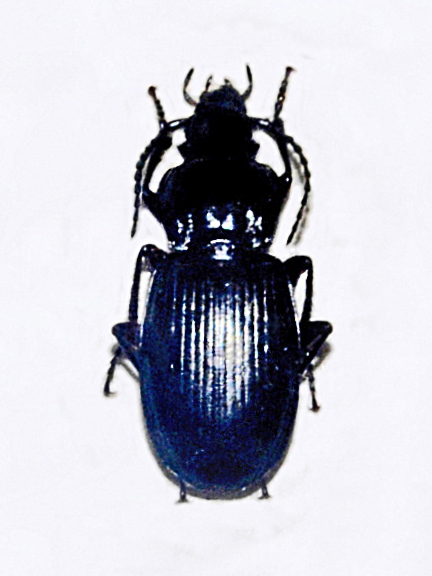
- Pterostichus morio liguricus

Scientific classification
- Domain: Eukaryota
- Kingdom: Animalia
- Phylum: Arthropoda
- Class: Insecta
- Order: Coleoptera
- Suborder: Adephaga
- Family: Carabidae
- Subfamily: Pterostichinae
- Tribe: Pterostichini
- Genus: Pterostichus
- Species: P. morio

Binomial name
- Pterostichus morio (Duftschmid, 1812)

Synonyms
- Oreophilus morio

= Pterostichus morio =

Species of beetle

Pterostichus morio is a species of ground beetles in the subfamily Pterostichinae.

== Description ==
Pterostichus morio can reach a length of 11–14 millimetres (0.43–0.55 in). Body is black, with reddish femora. These beetles are predatory.

== Distribution ==
This species is present in Austria, France, Italy, Poland, Slovakia, Slovenia and Switzerland. These beetles can be found under rocks and prefer slightly moist, sandy soil.

== Subspecies ==
- Pterostichus morio baudii (Chaudoir, 1868)
- Pterostichus morio carpathicus Kult, 1944
- Pterostichus morio guedeli Sainte-Claire Deville, 1902
- Pterostichus morio liguricus J. Daniel, 1903
- Pterostichus morio morio (Duftschmid, 1812)
- Pterostichus morio samniticus A. Fiori, 1896
- Pterostichus morio validiusculus (Chaudoir, 1859)
