= Pterostichus subacutus =

Scientific classification
- Kingdom: Animalia
- Phylum: Arthropoda
- Class: Insecta
- Order: Coleoptera
- Suborder: Adephaga
- Family: Carabidae
- Genus: Pterostichus
- Species: P. subacutus

Binomial name
- Pterostichus subacutus (Casey, 1918)

Species of beetle

Pterostichus subacutus is a species of woodland ground beetle in the family Carabidae which is found in North America.
