= Pterostichus protractus =

Scientific classification
- Domain: Eukaryota
- Kingdom: Animalia
- Phylum: Arthropoda
- Class: Insecta
- Order: Coleoptera
- Suborder: Adephaga
- Family: Carabidae
- Genus: Pterostichus
- Species: P. protractus

Binomial name
- Pterostichus protractus Leconte, 1860

Synonyms
- Pterostichus intectus (Casey, 1918); Pterostichus zunianus Casey, 1913

Species of beetle

Pterostichus protractus is a species of woodland ground beetle in the family Carabidae. It is found in North America.
