= Pterostichus castaneus =

Scientific classification
- Kingdom: Animalia
- Phylum: Arthropoda
- Class: Insecta
- Order: Coleoptera
- Suborder: Adephaga
- Family: Carabidae
- Genus: Pterostichus
- Species: P. castaneus

Binomial name
- Pterostichus castaneus (Dejean, 1828)

Synonyms
- Feronia brunnea Dejean, 1828; Feronia castanea Dejean, 1828; Feronia sejungenda Chaudoir, 1868; Hypherpes terracensis Casey, 1924; Pterostichus sejungendus (Chaudoir, 1868); Pterostichus wrangelli Casey, 1913

Species of beetle

Pterostichus castaneus is a species of woodland ground beetle in the family Carabidae. It is found in North America.
