= Pterostichus similis =

Scientific classification
- Domain: Eukaryota
- Kingdom: Animalia
- Phylum: Arthropoda
- Class: Insecta
- Order: Coleoptera
- Suborder: Adephaga
- Family: Carabidae
- Genus: Pterostichus
- Species: P. similis

Binomial name
- Pterostichus similis Mannerheim, 1852

Species of beetle

Pterostichus similis is a species of woodland ground beetle in the family Carabidae. It is found in Europe and Northern Asia (excluding China) and North America.
