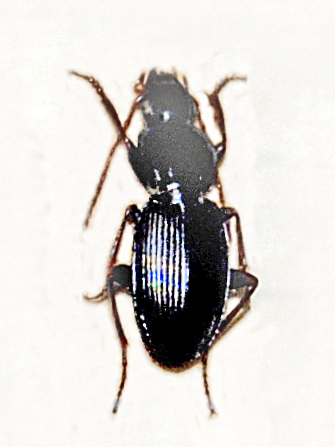

Scientific classification
- Kingdom: Animalia
- Phylum: Arthropoda
- Class: Insecta
- Order: Coleoptera
- Suborder: Adephaga
- Family: Carabidae
- Subfamily: Pterostichinae
- Tribe: Pterostichini
- Genus: Pterostichus
- Species: P. nicaeensis

Binomial name
- Pterostichus nicaeensis (A. Villa & G.B. Villa, 1835)

Synonyms
- Feronia nicaeensis (A. & G.B.Villa, 1835); Haptoderus nicaeensis (A. & G.B.Villa, 1835); Steropus nicaeensis A. & G.B.Villa, 1835

= Pterostichus nicaeensis =

Species of beetle

Pterostichus nicaeensis is a species of ground beetle in the subfamily Pterostichinae.

== Distribution and habitat ==
This species is present in the Alps of France and Italy. These beetles can be found under rocks and prefer slightly moist, sandy soil.
