= Pterostichus vermiculosus =

Scientific classification
- Domain: Eukaryota
- Kingdom: Animalia
- Phylum: Arthropoda
- Class: Insecta
- Order: Coleoptera
- Suborder: Adephaga
- Family: Carabidae
- Genus: Pterostichus
- Species: P. vermiculosus

Binomial name
- Pterostichus vermiculosus (Ménétriés, 1851)

Species of beetle

Pterostichus vermiculosus is a species of ground beetle in the family Carabidae. It is found in Europe and Northern Asia (excluding China) and North America. In Russia, this species is found in lichen moss tundra, shrub tundra, and tundra lowlands.
