= Pterostichus agonus =

Scientific classification
- Domain: Eukaryota
- Kingdom: Animalia
- Phylum: Arthropoda
- Class: Insecta
- Order: Coleoptera
- Suborder: Adephaga
- Family: Carabidae
- Genus: Pterostichus
- Species: P. agonus

Binomial name
- Pterostichus agonus G. Horn, 1880

Species of beetle

Pterostichus agonus is a species of woodland ground beetle in the family Carabidae. It is found in Europe and Northern Asia (excluding China) and North America.

== Subspecies ==
These two subspecies belong to the species Pterostichus agonus:

- Pterostichus agonus agonus G.Horn, 1880
- Pterostichus agonus averenskii O. & E.Berlov, 1997
