= Pterostichus costatus =

Scientific classification
- Domain: Eukaryota
- Kingdom: Animalia
- Phylum: Arthropoda
- Class: Insecta
- Order: Coleoptera
- Suborder: Adephaga
- Family: Carabidae
- Genus: Pterostichus
- Species: P. costatus

Binomial name
- Pterostichus costatus (Ménétriés, 1851)

Species of beetle

Pterostichus costatus is a species of woodland ground beetle in the family Carabidae. It is found in Europe and Northern Asia (excluding China) and North America.
