= Pterostichus californicus =

Scientific classification
- Kingdom: Animalia
- Phylum: Arthropoda
- Class: Insecta
- Order: Coleoptera
- Suborder: Adephaga
- Family: Carabidae
- Genus: Pterostichus
- Species: P. californicus

Binomial name
- Pterostichus californicus (Dejean, 1828)

Synonyms
- Pterostichus diabolus Casey, 1913

Species of beetle

Pterostichus californicus is a species of woodland ground beetle in the family Carabidae.
