= Pterostichus adoxus =

Scientific classification
- Domain: Eukaryota
- Kingdom: Animalia
- Phylum: Arthropoda
- Class: Insecta
- Order: Coleoptera
- Suborder: Adephaga
- Family: Carabidae
- Genus: Pterostichus
- Species: P. adoxus

Binomial name
- Pterostichus adoxus (Say, 1823)

Species of beetle

Pterostichus adoxus is a species of woodland ground beetle in the family Carabidae. It is found in North America. Larvae are predators.

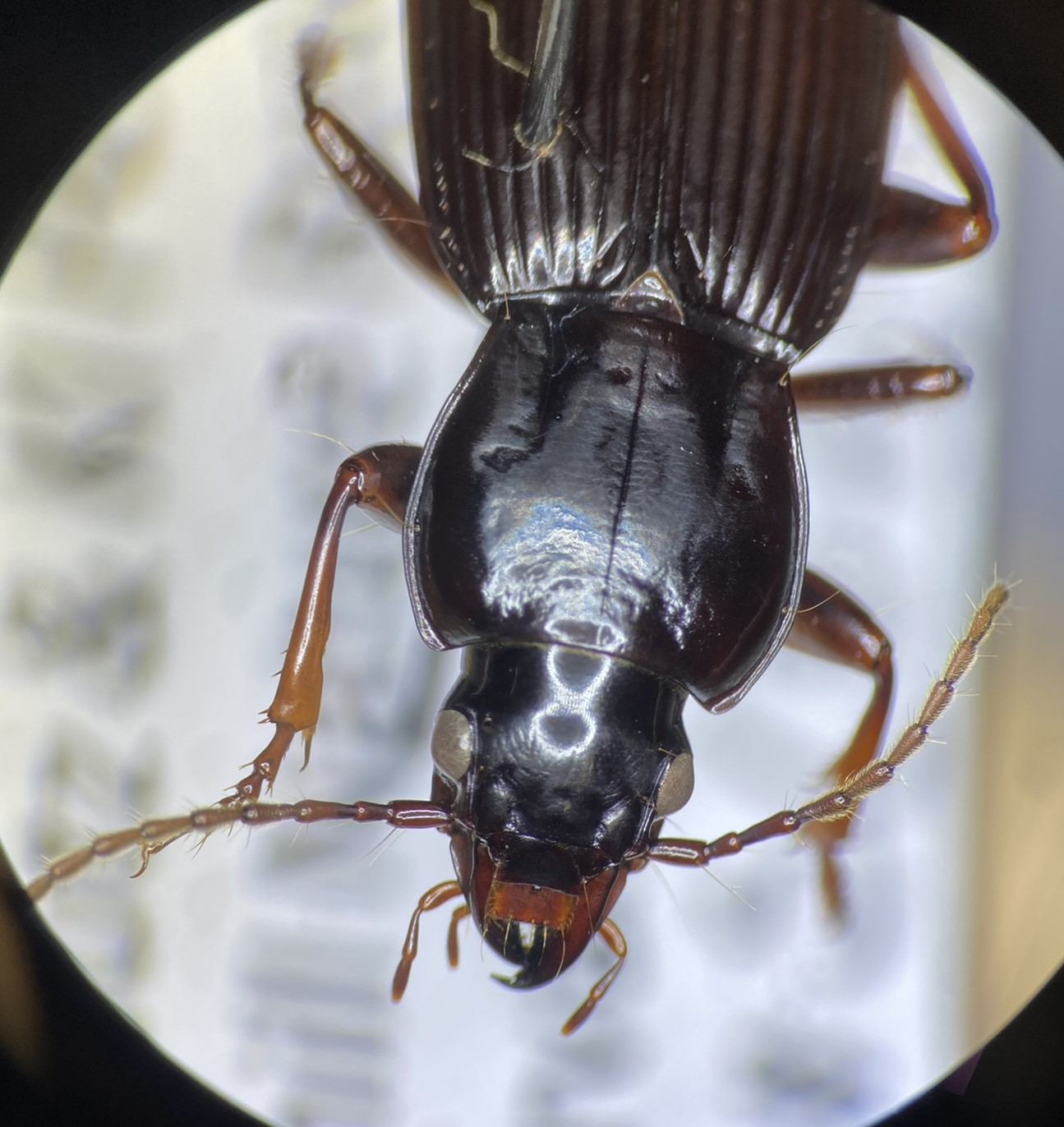
This specimen of Pterostichus adoxus (Say, 1823) was collected by pitfall trap in southwestern Pennsylvania.
