= Pterostichus diligendus =

Scientific classification
- Domain: Eukaryota
- Kingdom: Animalia
- Phylum: Arthropoda
- Class: Insecta
- Order: Coleoptera
- Suborder: Adephaga
- Family: Carabidae
- Genus: Pterostichus
- Species: P. diligendus

Binomial name
- Pterostichus diligendus (Chaudoir, 1868)

Synonyms
- Pterostichus osculans Casey, 1884

Species of beetle

Pterostichus diligendus is a species of woodland ground beetle in the family Carabidae. It is found in North America.
