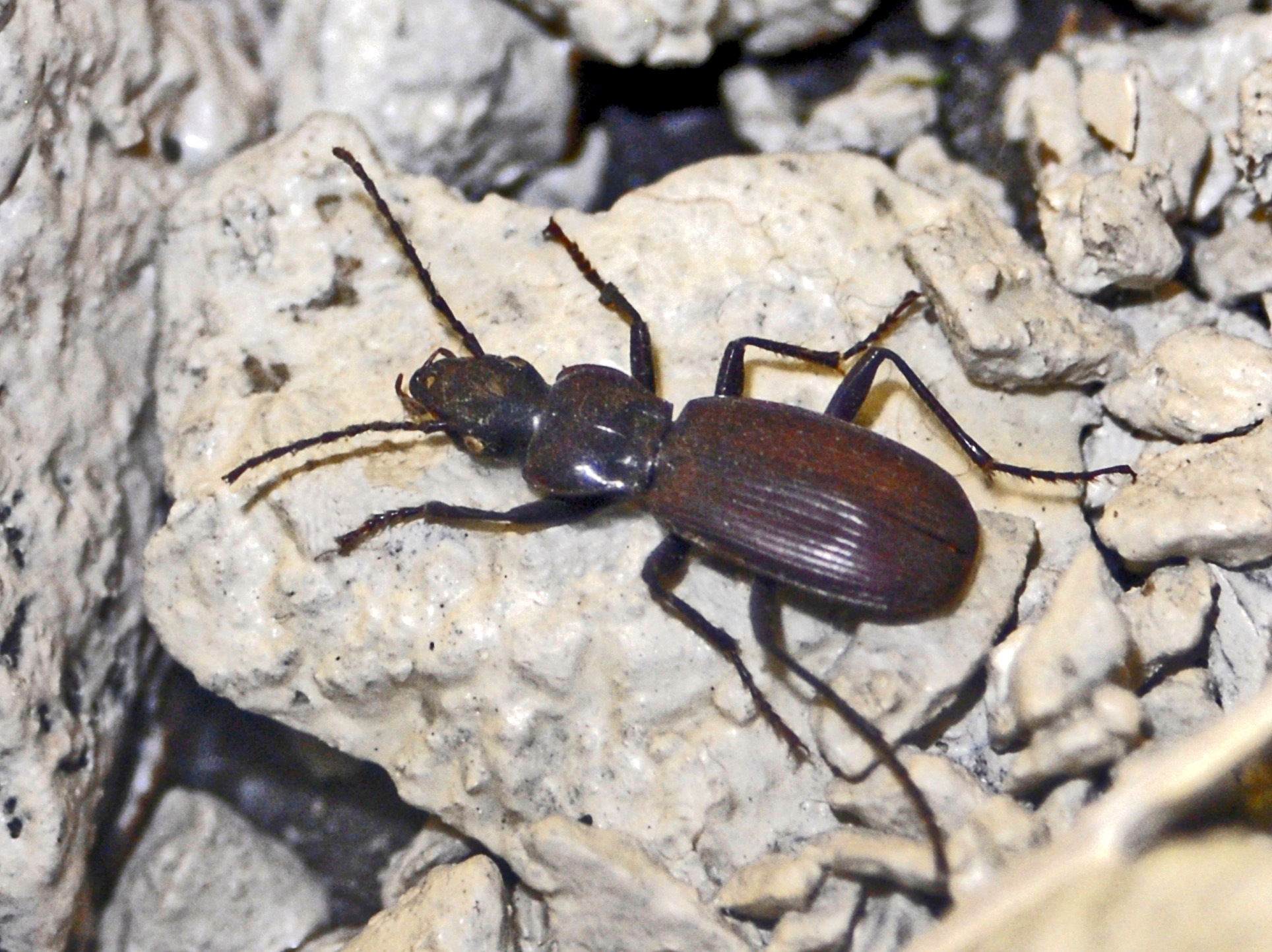

Scientific classification
- Kingdom: Animalia
- Phylum: Arthropoda
- Class: Insecta
- Order: Coleoptera
- Suborder: Adephaga
- Family: Carabidae
- Subfamily: Pterostichinae
- Tribe: Pterostichini
- Genus: Pterostichus
- Species: P. honnoratii

Binomial name
- Pterostichus honnoratii ( Dejean, 1828)

Synonyms
- Pterostichus honnorati (Dejean, 1828)

= Pterostichus honnoratii =

Species of beetle

Pterostichus honnoratii is a species of ground beetles belonging to the family Carabidae.

== Subspecies ==
- Pterostichus honnoratii honnoratii (Dejean, 1828)
- Pterostichus honnoratii ludovici Schatzmayr, 1930
- Pterostichus honnoratii sellae Stierlin, 1881

== Description ==
Pterostichus honnoratii can reach a length of about 15 millimetres (0.59 in). The three subspecies differ in the morphology of posterior angles (ssp. sellae: obtuse and blunt; ssp. honnoratii: right and protruding) and anterior angles (ssp. honnoratii: protruding; ssp. ludovici: little protruding) of pronotum. These beetles are predatory.

== Distribution ==
This species is present in Italy, in France and in Switzerland.

== Habitat ==
P. honnoratii lives in the high alpine areas and in lower altitude in forests. It prefers the limestone screes and the debris of calcareous schists. These beetles can be found under rocks and prefer slightly moist, sandy soil.
