= Pterostichus moestus =

Scientific classification
- Domain: Eukaryota
- Kingdom: Animalia
- Phylum: Arthropoda
- Class: Insecta
- Order: Coleoptera
- Suborder: Adephaga
- Family: Carabidae
- Genus: Pterostichus
- Species: P. moestus

Binomial name
- Pterostichus moestus (Say, 1823)

Synonyms
- Pterostichus perseverus (Motschulsky, 1866)

Species of beetle

Pterostichus moestus is a species of woodland ground beetle in the family Carabidae. It is found in North America.
