= Pterostichus diligens =

Scientific classification
- Domain: Eukaryota
- Kingdom: Animalia
- Phylum: Arthropoda
- Class: Insecta
- Order: Coleoptera
- Suborder: Adephaga
- Family: Carabidae
- Subfamily: Pterostichinae
- Tribe: Pterostichini
- Genus: Pterostichus
- Species: P. diligens

Binomial name
- Pterostichus diligens ( Sturm, 1824)

Species of beetle

Pterostichus diligens is a species of ground beetle native to Europe.
