= Pterostichus walteri =

Scientific classification
- Kingdom: Animalia
- Phylum: Arthropoda
- Class: Insecta
- Order: Coleoptera
- Suborder: Adephaga
- Family: Carabidae
- Genus: Pterostichus
- Species: P. walteri

Binomial name
- Pterostichus walteri Reitter, 1883

Species of beetle

Pterostichus walteri is a species of ground beetle native to Europe.
