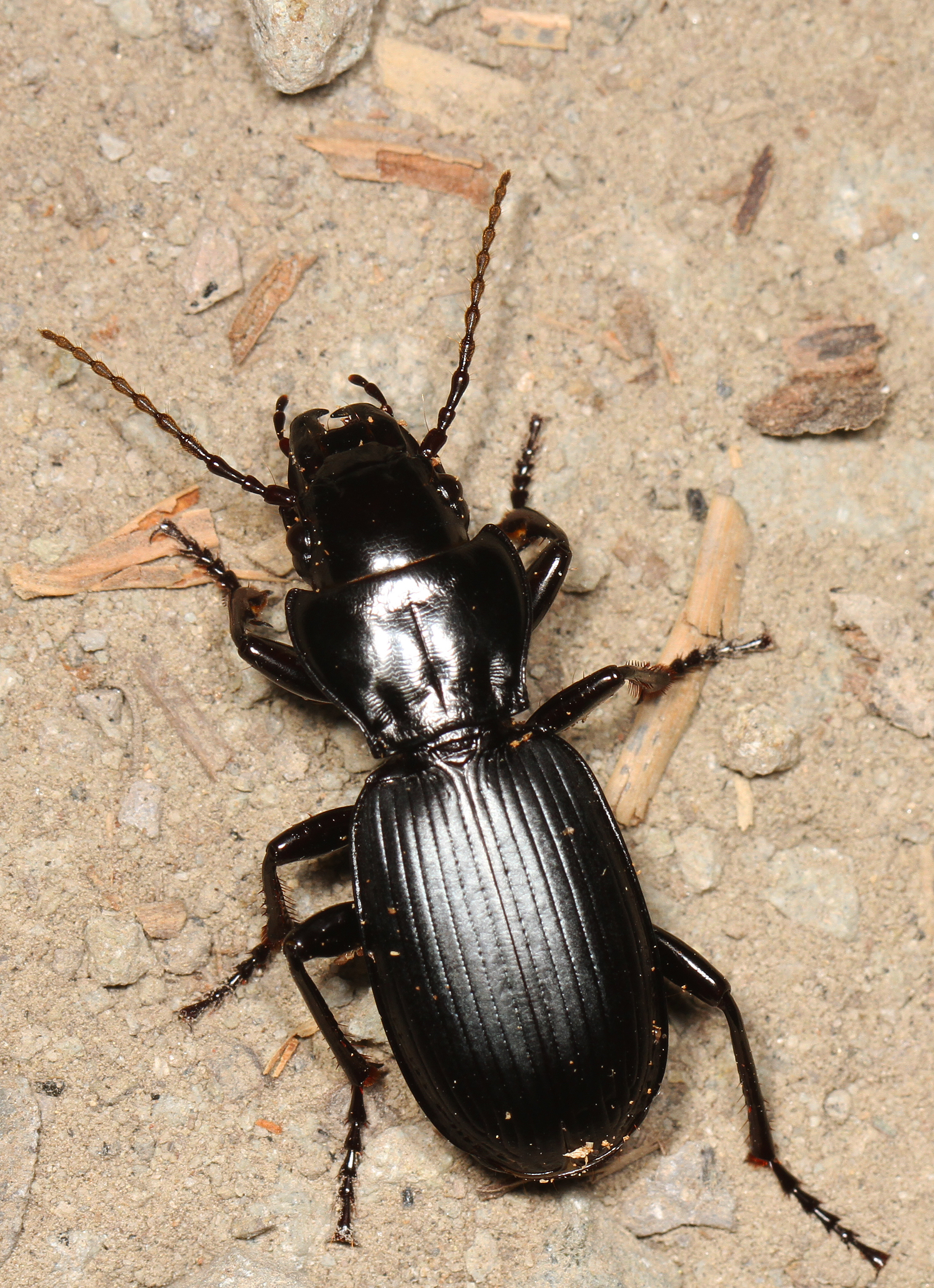

Scientific classification
- Domain: Eukaryota
- Kingdom: Animalia
- Phylum: Arthropoda
- Class: Insecta
- Order: Coleoptera
- Suborder: Adephaga
- Family: Carabidae
- Genus: Pterostichus
- Species: P. lama

Binomial name
- Pterostichus lama (Ménétriés, 1843)

= Pterostichus lama =

Species of beetle

Pterostichus lama or giant woodland ground beetle is a North American species of woodland ground beetle in the family Carabidae. It is found in California, Nevada, Oregon, and Washington in the United States, and in British Columbia in Canada. These large (15-29 mm), flightless black beetles have strong mandibles. They feed on termites and ants.

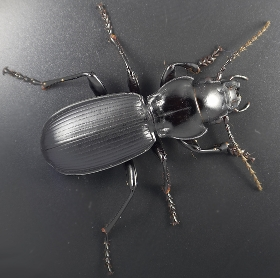
