= Pterostichus barri =

Scientific classification
- Domain: Eukaryota
- Kingdom: Animalia
- Phylum: Arthropoda
- Class: Insecta
- Order: Coleoptera
- Suborder: Adephaga
- Family: Carabidae
- Genus: Pterostichus
- Species: P. barri

Binomial name
- Pterostichus barri Bousquet, 2006

Species of beetle

Pterostichus barri is a species of woodland ground beetle in the family Carabidae. It is found in North America.
