= Pterostichus herculaneus =

Scientific classification
- Domain: Eukaryota
- Kingdom: Animalia
- Phylum: Arthropoda
- Class: Insecta
- Order: Coleoptera
- Suborder: Adephaga
- Family: Carabidae
- Genus: Pterostichus
- Species: P. herculaneus

Binomial name
- Pterostichus herculaneus Mannerheim, 1843

Species of beetle

Pterostichus herculaneus is a species of woodland ground beetle in the family Carabidae. It is found in North America.
