= Pterostichus novus =

Scientific classification
- Kingdom: Animalia
- Phylum: Arthropoda
- Class: Insecta
- Order: Coleoptera
- Suborder: Adephaga
- Family: Carabidae
- Genus: Pterostichus
- Species: P. novus

Binomial name
- Pterostichus novus Straneo, 1944

Species of beetle

Pterostichus novus is a species of woodland ground beetle in the family Carabidae. It is found in North America.
