= Pterostichus congestus =

Scientific classification
- Domain: Eukaryota
- Kingdom: Animalia
- Phylum: Arthropoda
- Class: Insecta
- Order: Coleoptera
- Suborder: Adephaga
- Family: Carabidae
- Genus: Pterostichus
- Species: P. congestus

Binomial name
- Pterostichus congestus (Menetries, 1843)

Synonyms
- Pterostichus breviusculus mimus Casey, 1913; Pterostichus curtipennis (Motschulsky, 1859); Pterostichus mimus Casey, 1913; Pterostichus plutonicus Casey, 1913

Species of beetle

Pterostichus congestus is a species of woodland ground beetle in the family Carabidae. It is found in North America.
