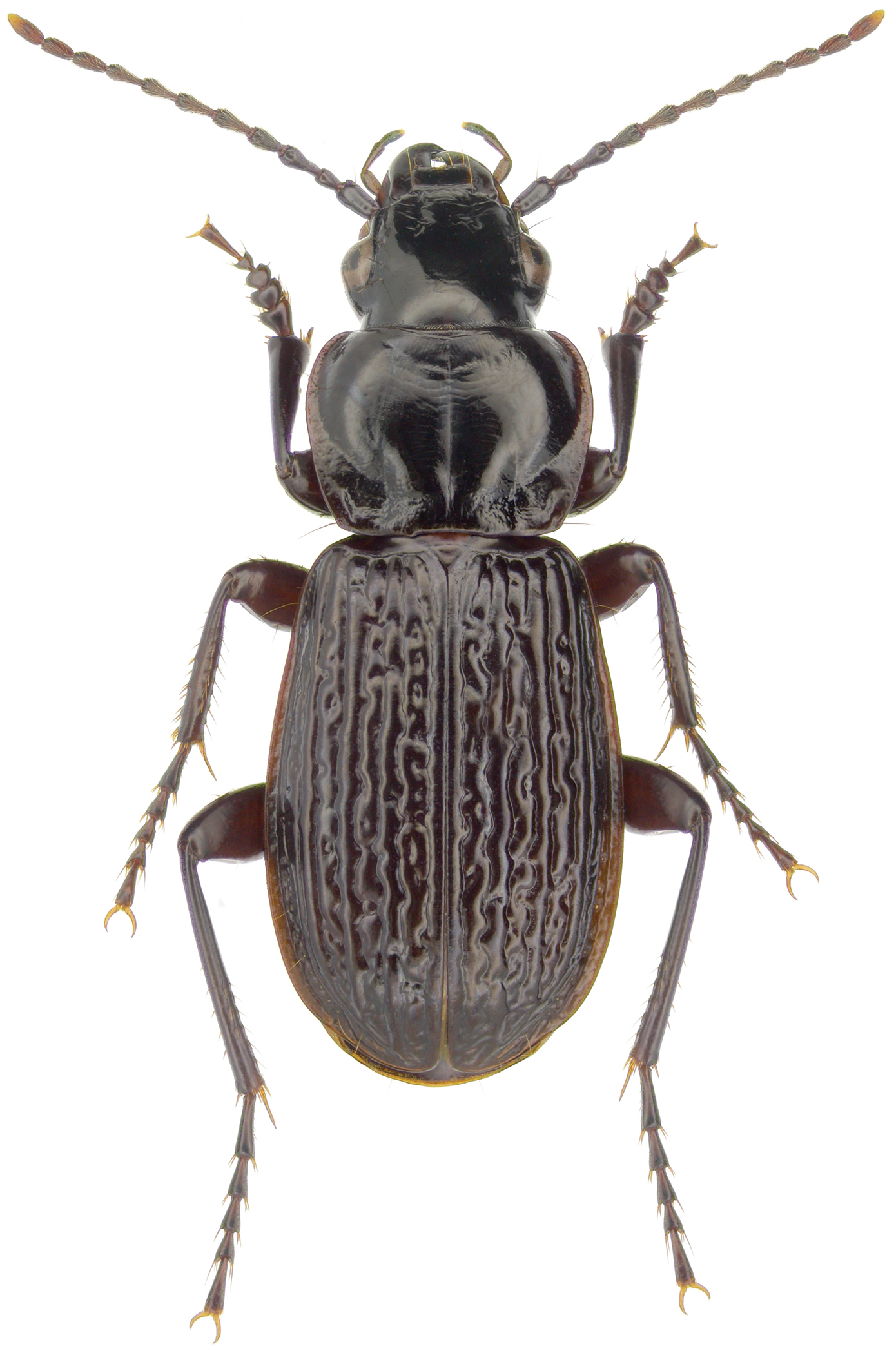

Scientific classification
- Domain: Eukaryota
- Kingdom: Animalia
- Phylum: Arthropoda
- Class: Insecta
- Order: Coleoptera
- Suborder: Adephaga
- Family: Carabidae
- Genus: Pterostichus
- Species: P. punctatissimus

Binomial name
- Pterostichus punctatissimus (Randall, 1838)

= Pterostichus punctatissimus =

Species of beetle

Pterostichus punctatissimus is a species of woodland ground beetle in the family Carabidae. It is found in North America.
