= Pterostichus circulosus =

Scientific classification
- Domain: Eukaryota
- Kingdom: Animalia
- Phylum: Arthropoda
- Class: Insecta
- Order: Coleoptera
- Suborder: Adephaga
- Family: Carabidae
- Genus: Pterostichus
- Species: P. circulosus

Binomial name
- Pterostichus circulosus Lindroth, 1966

Species of beetle

Pterostichus circulosus is a species of woodland ground beetle in the family Carabidae. It is found in North America.
