= Pterostichus acutipes =

Scientific classification
- Domain: Eukaryota
- Kingdom: Animalia
- Phylum: Arthropoda
- Class: Insecta
- Order: Coleoptera
- Suborder: Adephaga
- Family: Carabidae
- Genus: Pterostichus
- Species: P. acutipes

Binomial name
- Pterostichus acutipes Barr, 1971

Species of beetle

Pterostichus acutipes is a species of woodland ground beetle in the family Carabidae. It is found in North America.

== Subspecies ==
These two subspecies belong to the species Pterostichus acutipes:

- Pterostichus acutipes acutipes Barr, 1971
- Pterostichus acutipes kentuckensis Barr, 1971
