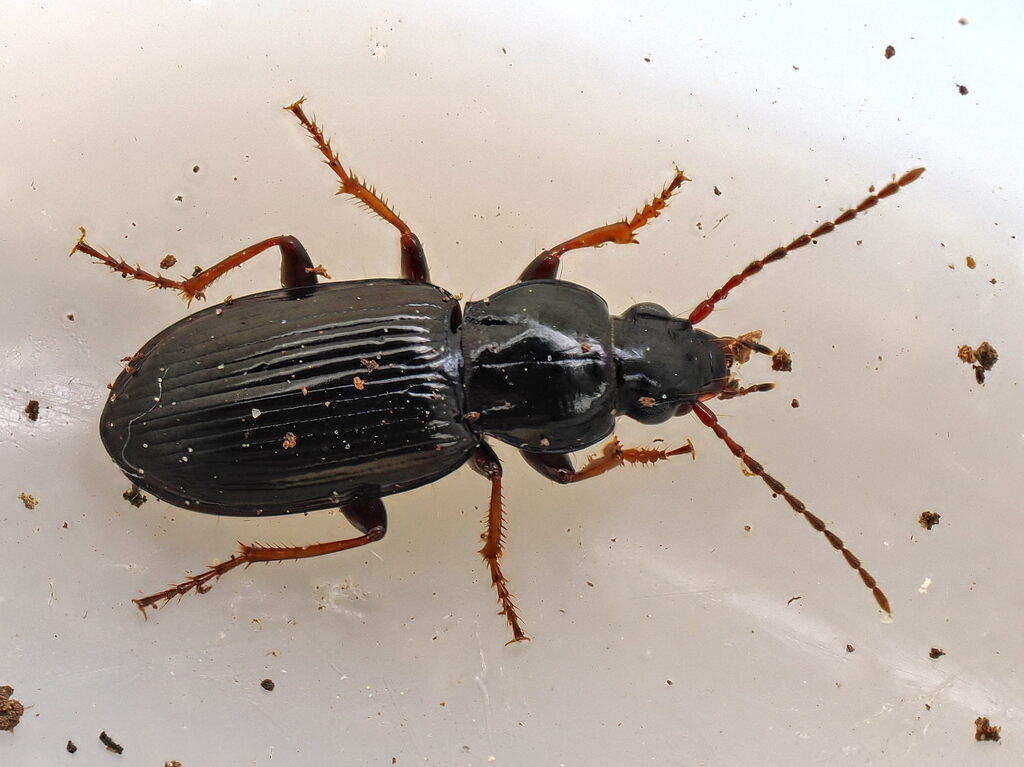
- Pterostichus strenuus from Wallonia, Belgium

Scientific classification
- Kingdom: Animalia
- Phylum: Arthropoda
- Clade: Pancrustacea
- Class: Insecta
- Order: Coleoptera
- Suborder: Adephaga
- Family: Carabidae
- Genus: Pterostichus
- Species: P. strenuus

Binomial name
- Pterostichus strenuus (Panzer, 1796)

= Pterostichus strenuus =

Species of beetle

Pterostichus strenuus is a species of woodland ground beetle in the family Carabidae. It is found in North America, Europe, and temperate Asia.
