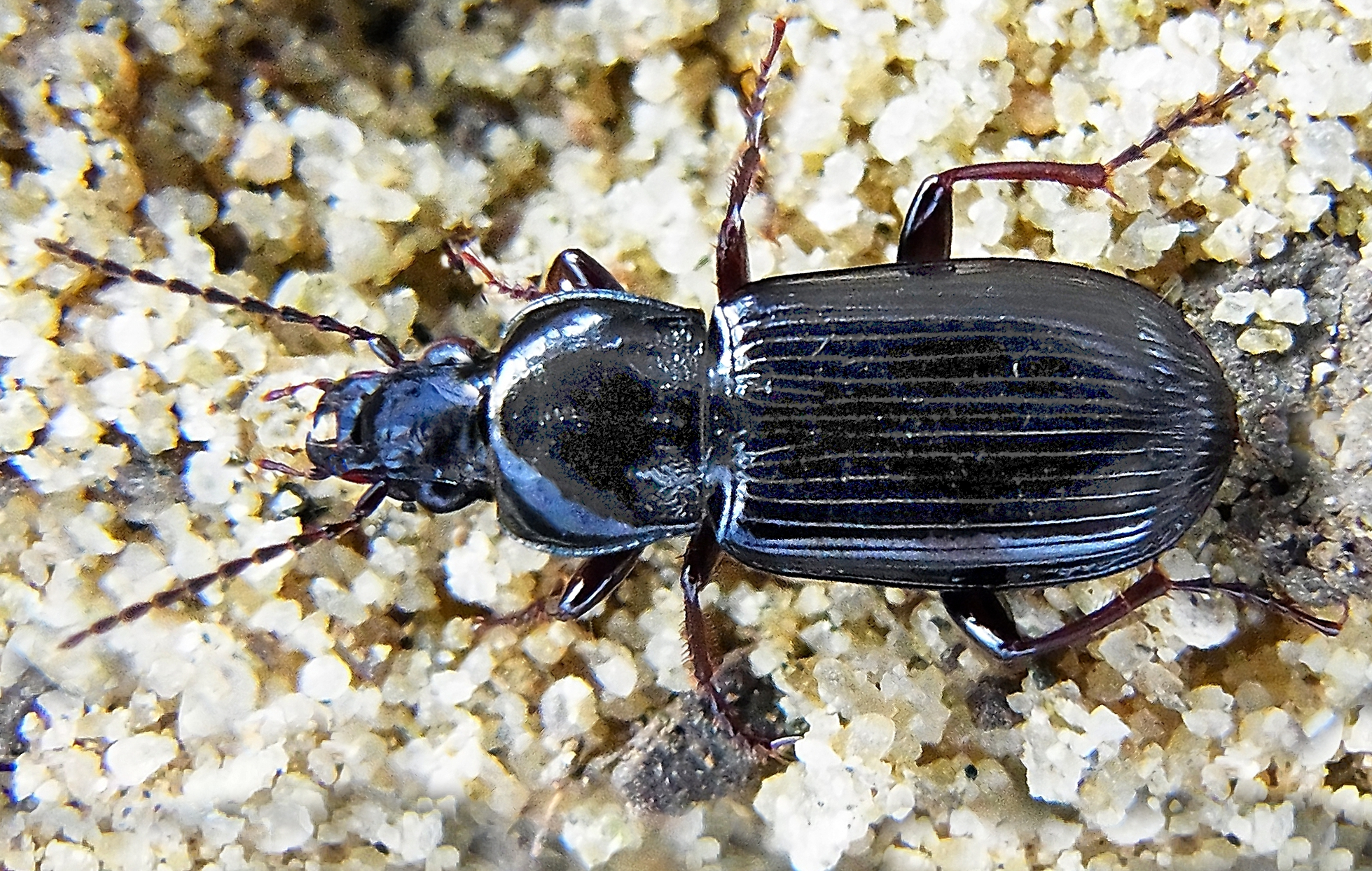
- Pterostichus anthracinus

Scientific classification
- Domain: Eukaryota
- Kingdom: Animalia
- Phylum: Arthropoda
- Class: Insecta
- Order: Coleoptera
- Suborder: Adephaga
- Family: Carabidae
- Subfamily: Pterostichinae
- Tribe: Pterostichini
- Genus: Pterostichus; Bonelli, 1810

= Pterostichus =

Genus of beetles

Pterostichus is a very large genus of ground beetles with a Holarctic distribution in the subfamily Harpalinae. It has over 1,200 species. The beetles are predatory, but sometimes feed on strawberries. They can be found under rocks and prefer slightly moist, sandy soil although preferences differ between species.

== Species ==
These species and subgenera are included in the genus Pterostichus.

Subgenus Abea Morita, 1992

- Pterostichus yamauchii Morita, 1992

Subgenus Adelopterus Reitter, 1886

- Pterostichus ambiguus (Fairmaire, 1858)

Subgenus Adelosia Stephens, 1835

- Pterostichus macer (Marsham, 1802)

Subgenus Agastillus Reitter, 1892

- Pterostichus capitatus (Chaudoir, 1850)
- Pterostichus cratocephalus (Tschitscherine, 1897)
- Pterostichus cucujinus Reitter, 1892
- Pterostichus eriwanicus (Tschitscherine, 1897)

Subgenus Anilloferonia Van Dyke, 1926

- Pterostichus diana LaBonte, 2013
- Pterostichus malkini (Hatch, 1953)
- Pterostichus testaceus (Van Dyke, 1926)

Subgenus Anomostichus Sciaky, 1995

- Pterostichus anomostriatus Sciaky, 1995

Subgenus Aphaonus Reitter, 1887

- Pterostichus arcanoides (Lorenz, 1998)
- Pterostichus compressus (Rost, 1892)
- Pterostichus cylindriformis (Reitter, 1887)
- Pterostichus koenigianus (Tschitscherine, 1891)
- Pterostichus mariamae Zamotajlov; Solodovnikov & Fominykh, 2015
- Pterostichus miroshnikovi (Zamotajlov, 1991)
- Pterostichus neilgaimani Chaladze & Kalatozishvili, 2017
- Pterostichus pseudopercus (Reitter, 1889)
- Pterostichus starckianus (Reitter, 1887)
- Pterostichus svetlanae Zamotajlov; Solodovnikov & Fominykh, 2015
- Pterostichus trubilini Zamotajlov, 1997

Subgenus Argutor Dejean, 1821

- Pterostichus aanistschenkoi O. & E.Berlov, 1999
- Pterostichus akozyrevi O. & E.Berlov, 1999
- Pterostichus bhadravati Jedlicka, 1965
- Pterostichus chameleon (Motschulsky, 1866)
- Pterostichus commutabilis (Motschulsky, 1866)
- Pterostichus cryobioides (Chaudoir, 1868)
- Pterostichus cursor (Dejean, 1828)
- Pterostichus dulcis (Bates, 1883)
- Pterostichus kerzhneri Lafer, 1983
- Pterostichus leonisi Apfelbeck, 1904
- Pterostichus praetermissus (Chaudoir, 1868)
- Pterostichus sulcitarsis A.Morawitz, 1862
- Pterostichus vernalis (Panzer, 1796)

Subgenus Asioplatysma Kryzhanovskij, 1968

- Pterostichus capito (Tschitscherine, 1900)
- Pterostichus darvazicus Kryzhanovskij, 1968
- Pterostichus karateghinicus Mikhailov, 1972
- Pterostichus klapperichi Jedlicka, 1956
- Pterostichus medvedevi Kryzhanovskij & Mikhailov, 1972
- Pterostichus mujahedeeni Savich, 1999
- Pterostichus rufopiceus Heyden, 1890
- Pterostichus talibani Savich, 1999

Subgenus Badistrinus Motschulsky, 1866

- Pterostichus arrowi Jedlicka, 1936
- Pterostichus arrowianus Jedlicka, 1938
- Pterostichus bandotaro Tanaka, 1958
- Pterostichus doris Jedlicka, 1962
- Pterostichus haptoderoides Tschitscherine, 1889
- Pterostichus kajimurai Habu & Tanaka, 1957
- Pterostichus laticollis (Motschulsky, 1844)
- Pterostichus procephalus Bates, 1873

Subgenus Bothriopterus Chaudoir, 1835

- Pterostichus ademidovae O.Berlov, 1996
- Pterostichus adstrictus Eschscholtz, 1823
- Pterostichus aeneocupreus (Fairmaire, 1887)
- Pterostichus bhunetansis Davies, 2004
- Pterostichus commixtiformis Roubal, 1920
- Pterostichus ferghanicus Kabak, 2001
- Pterostichus lustrans LeConte, 1851
- Pterostichus mariae (Lutshnik, 1921)
- Pterostichus mutus (Say, 1823)
- Pterostichus oblongopunctatus (Fabricius, 1787)
- Pterostichus oregonus LeConte, 1861
- Pterostichus pensylvanicus LeConte, 1873
- Pterostichus quadrifoveolatus Letzner, 1852
- Pterostichus subovatus (Motschulsky, 1861)
- Pterostichus trinarius (Casey, 1918)
- Pterostichus tropicalis (Bates, 1882)
- Pterostichus zyzzovi O. & E.Berlov, 1996

Subgenus Calopterus Chaudoir, 1838

- Pterostichus pilosus (Host, 1790)
- Pterostichus selmanni (Duftschmid, 1812)

Subgenus Carllindrothius Habu, 1984

- Pterostichus colonus (Bates, 1883)

Subgenus Cheporus Latreille, 1829

- Pterostichus burmeisteri Heer, 1837
- Pterostichus dissimilis (A. & G.B.Villa, 1833)
- Pterostichus muehlfeldii (Duftschmid, 1812)
- Pterostichus transversalis (Duftschmid, 1812)

Subgenus Chinapterus O.Berlov, 1998

- Pterostichus lianhuaensis Dorjerem; Shi & Liang, 2020
- Pterostichus liupanensis Dorjerem; Shi & Liang, 2020
- Pterostichus przewalskyi Tschitscherine, 1888
- Pterostichus singularis Tschitscherine, 1889

Subgenus Circinatus Sciaky, 1996

- Pterostichus adelphus Shi & Liang, 2015
- Pterostichus agilis Allegro & Sciaky, 2010
- Pterostichus ailaoicus Shi & Liang, 2015
- Pterostichus baenningeri Jedlicka, 1931
- Pterostichus batxatensis Fedorenko, 2019
- Pterostichus beneshi Sciaky, 1996
- Pterostichus bullatus Allegro & Sciaky, 2010
- Pterostichus camelus Shi & Liang, 2015
- Pterostichus caobang Fedorenko, 2019
- Pterostichus cavazzutianus Shi & Liang, 2015
- Pterostichus dentifer Allegro & Sciaky, 2010
- Pterostichus dimorphus Shi & Liang, 2015
- Pterostichus expolitus Fedorenko, 2019
- Pterostichus hoanglien Fedorenko, 2019
- Pterostichus laocaiensis Fedorenko, 2019
- Pterostichus liciniformis Csiki, 1930
- Pterostichus maitreya Shi & Liang, 2015
- Pterostichus miao Shi & Liang, 2015
- Pterostichus phangxipang Fedorenko, 2019
- Pterostichus phiaoc Fedorenko, 2019
- Pterostichus pohnerti Jedlicka, 1934
- Pterostichus subtilissimus Sciaky, 1996
- Pterostichus tumulus Shi & Liang, 2015
- Pterostichus wangjiani Shi & Liang, 2015
- Pterostichus xilingensis Allegro & Sciaky, 2010
- Pterostichus yan Shi & Liang, 2015
- Pterostichus yuxiaodongi Shi & Liang, 2015
- Pterostichus zhygealu Shi & Liang, 2015
- Pterostichus zoiai Sciaky, 1996

Subgenus Cophosus Dejean, 1821

- Pterostichus cylindricus (Herbst, 1784)

Subgenus Cryobius Chaudoir, 1838

- Pterostichus abaxoides (Dejean, 1828)
- Pterostichus acrogonus (Chaudoir, 1843)
- Pterostichus akkusianus Kirschenhofer, 1981
- Pterostichus altaiensis (Poppius, 1906)
- Pterostichus amaroides (Dejean, 1828)
- Pterostichus amblypterus (Chaudoir, 1868)
- Pterostichus amoenus (Dejean, 1828)
- Pterostichus amurensis (Poppius, 1906)
- Pterostichus anatolicus Jedlicka, 1963
- Pterostichus apenninus (Dejean, 1831)
- Pterostichus aralarensis (Mateu, 1945)
- Pterostichus archangaicus Shilenkov, 2000
- Pterostichus arcticola (Chaudoir, 1868)
- Pterostichus argutoriformis (Poppius, 1906)
- Pterostichus auriga Ball, 1962
- Pterostichus bargusinicus Shilenkov, 2000
- Pterostichus barlensis Straneo, 1935
- Pterostichus barryorum Ball, 1962
- Pterostichus biocryus Ball, 1962
- Pterostichus blandulus L.Miller, 1859
- Pterostichus blumenthali Heinz, 1965
- Pterostichus brevicornis (Kirby, 1837)
- Pterostichus breviusculus (R.F.Sahlberg, 1844)
- Pterostichus bryanti (Van Dyke, 1951)
- Pterostichus bryantoides Ball, 1962
- Pterostichus burjaticus (Poppius, 1906)
- Pterostichus cacumensis Ball, 1966
- Pterostichus cantabricus (L.Schaufuss, 1862)
- Pterostichus caribou Ball, 1962
- Pterostichus carradei (Gautier des Cottes, 1866)
- Pterostichus champenoisi (Croissandeau, 1893)
- Pterostichus chipewyan Ball, 1962
- Pterostichus colasi (Jeannel, 1937)
- Pterostichus convexus (Gebler, 1847)
- Pterostichus coreicus Jedlicka, 1962
- Pterostichus davshensis Shilenkov, 2000
- Pterostichus dubiosus (Tschitscherine, 1894)
- Pterostichus ehlersi (Heyden, 1881)
- Pterostichus empetricola (Dejean, 1828)
- Pterostichus espanoli (J. & E.Vives, 1977)
- Pterostichus euxinus Straneo, 1935
- Pterostichus exceptus (J.Sahlberg, 1885)
- Pterostichus firmus (Lutshnik, 1933)
- Pterostichus fulvescens (Motschulsky, 1844)
- Pterostichus gerstlensis Ball, 1962
- Pterostichus glacialis (Brisout de Barneville, 1863)
- Pterostichus glukhomanka Sundukov, 2013
- Pterostichus haftorni Lindroth, 1969
- Pterostichus herzi (Poppius, 1906)
- Pterostichus homalonotus (Tschitscherine, 1894)
- Pterostichus horvatovichi Kirschenhofer, 1991
- Pterostichus hudsonicus LeConte, 1863
- Pterostichus infimus (Chaudoir, 1868)
- Pterostichus inopinatus (Lutshnik, 1933)
- Pterostichus iripennis (Chaudoir, 1868)
- Pterostichus ishiharai Ishida & Shibata, 1961
- Pterostichus jacobsoni (Poppius, 1906)
- Pterostichus jaechi Kirschenhofer, 1997
- Pterostichus josephi Csiki, 1930
- Pterostichus kadjaranze (Jedlicka, 1947)
- Pterostichus kaninensis (Poppius, 1906)
- Pterostichus kavanaughi Shilenkov, 2000
- Pterostichus kaynashensis Schweiger, 1967
- Pterostichus kolymensis Erjiomin, 1998
- Pterostichus korgei Jedlicka, 1964
- Pterostichus kotzebuei Ball, 1962
- Pterostichus kultianus Jedlicka, 1946
- Pterostichus kuraicus Shilenkov, 2000
- Pterostichus kurosai Tanaka, 1958
- Pterostichus kurosawai Tanaka, 1958
- Pterostichus lamuticus (Poppius, 1906)
- Pterostichus latiusculus (Chaudoir, 1868)
- Pterostichus longipes (Poppius, 1906)
- Pterostichus lucidus (Motschulsky, 1844)
- Pterostichus macedonicus Apfelbeck, 1918
- Pterostichus macrothorax (Poppius, 1906)
- Pterostichus maeklini (Poppius, 1906)
- Pterostichus mandibularoides Ball, 1966
- Pterostichus marani Jedlicka, 1967
- Pterostichus middendorffi (J.Sahlberg, 1875)
- Pterostichus negligens (Sturm, 1824)
- Pterostichus nemoralis (Graells, 1851)
- Pterostichus nigripalpis (Poppius, 1906)
- Pterostichus nivalis (R.F.Sahlberg, 1844)
- Pterostichus nordqvisti (J.Sahlberg, 1885)
- Pterostichus oblongiusculus (Motschulsky, 1850)
- Pterostichus ochoticus (R.F.Sahlberg, 1844)
- Pterostichus palekhai E. & O.Berlov, 1996
- Pterostichus parasimilis Ball, 1962
- Pterostichus parviceps (Poppius, 1906)
- Pterostichus pinguedineus (Eschscholtz, 1823)
- Pterostichus pithyusicus (Lutshnik, 1933)
- Pterostichus planus (J.Sahlberg, 1885)
- Pterostichus poppiusianus (Jakobson, 1907)
- Pterostichus procerulus (Heyden, 1880)
- Pterostichus properans (Chaudoir, 1868)
- Pterostichus pseudostuxbergi (Poppius, 1906)
- Pterostichus pumilio (Dejean, 1828)
- Pterostichus punctiger (J.Sahlberg, 1880)
- Pterostichus pusillus (Dejean, 1828)
- Pterostichus quadraticollis (Chaudoir, 1846)
- Pterostichus riparius (Dejean, 1828)
- Pterostichus rodiovoni Shilenkov, 2000
- Pterostichus rufonitens (Fairmaire, 1866)
- Pterostichus safonovae Budarin, 1995
- Pterostichus sahlbergi (Tschitscherine, 1894)
- Pterostichus scitus (Mäklin, 1878)
- Pterostichus shilenkovi Erjiomin & Kabak, 1991
- Pterostichus similis Mannerheim, 1852
- Pterostichus sojot Shilenkov, 2000
- Pterostichus soperi Ball, 1966
- Pterostichus splendidus Park, 2013
- Pterostichus spornyi Sundukov, 2013
- Pterostichus stantonensis Ball, 1966
- Pterostichus subgibbus (Motschulsky, 1860)
- Pterostichus subiasi (Ortuño & Zaballos, 1992)
- Pterostichus subsinuatus (Dejean, 1828)
- Pterostichus surgens LeConte, 1878
- Pterostichus tareumiut Ball, 1962
- Pterostichus taskylensis Shilenkov, 2000
- Pterostichus tatricus Kult, 1947
- Pterostichus theeli (Mäklin, 1878)
- Pterostichus tichomirovi Erjiomin, 1990
- Pterostichus tiliaceoradix Ball, 1962
- Pterostichus tokmakovae Sundukov, 2013
- Pterostichus tunkinensis Shilenkov, 2000
- Pterostichus udokanensis Shilenkov, 2000
- Pterostichus ulubeyensis Kirschenhofer, 1981
- Pterostichus unctulatus (Duftschmid, 1812)
- Pterostichus ventricosus (Eschscholtz, 1823)
- Pterostichus woodi Ball & Currie, 1997

Subgenus Cylindrocharis Casey, 1918

- Pterostichus acutipes Barr, 1971
- Pterostichus hypogeus Barr, 1971
- Pterostichus rostratus (Newman, 1838)

Subgenus Eosteropus Tschitscherine, 1902

- Pterostichus abensis Morita, 2010
- Pterostichus abudarini O. & E.Berlov, 1997
- Pterostichus aenescens (Chaudoir, 1850)
- Pterostichus aereipennis (Solsky, 1872)
- Pterostichus aethiops (Panzer, 1796)
- Pterostichus ainus Plutenko, 2005
- Pterostichus alacer A.Morawitz, 1862
- Pterostichus bituberculatus (Tschitscherine, 1899)
- Pterostichus circulosus Lindroth, 1966
- Pterostichus coruscus (Tschitscherine, 1895)
- Pterostichus creper (Tschitscherine, 1902)
- Pterostichus discrepans A.Morawitz, 1862
- Pterostichus dudkoi Sundukov, 2013
- Pterostichus faldermanni Schatzmayr, 1929
- Pterostichus funakoshii Morita, 2007
- Pterostichus hidanus Morita, 2010
- Pterostichus hiramatsui Morita, 2010
- Pterostichus hirasawai Morita, 2010
- Pterostichus imurai Morita, 2007
- Pterostichus japonicus (Motschulsky, 1861)
- Pterostichus karasawai Tanaka, 1958
- Pterostichus kimioi Morita, 2011
- Pterostichus makolskii G.Müller, 1933
- Pterostichus mandzhuricus (Lutshnik, 1916)
- Pterostichus mannerheimii (Dejean, 1831)
- Pterostichus matsunagai Morita, 2011
- Pterostichus maurusiacus (Mannerheim, 1825)
- Pterostichus mizunoyai Morita, 2007
- Pterostichus moestus (Say, 1823)
- Pterostichus nasuensis Morita, 2007
- Pterostichus noburai Morita, 2008
- Pterostichus ohkawai Morita, 2010
- Pterostichus orientalis (Motschulsky, 1844)
- Pterostichus rengensis Morita, 2010
- Pterostichus rufitarsis (Dejean, 1828)
- Pterostichus sakuraii Morita, 2008
- Pterostichus shimizui Morita, 2010
- Pterostichus sudai Morita, 1991
- Pterostichus superciliosus (Say, 1823)
- Pterostichus tenuimarginatus (Chaudoir, 1868)
- Pterostichus tokui Morita, 2007
- Pterostichus tuberculiger (Tschitscherine, 1897)
- Pterostichus virescens (Gebler, 1833)
- Pterostichus yoshizawai Morita, 2010

Subgenus Ethira Andrewes, 1936

- Pterostichus cometes (Andrewes, 1936)
- Pterostichus depilatus (Bates, 1889)
- Pterostichus heinzianus Sciaky, 1996
- Pterostichus multiseta (Straneo, 1984)
- Pterostichus piliferus (Bates, 1878)
- Pterostichus pseudopilifer (Straneo, 1957)
- Pterostichus rugiceps (Straneo, 1984)
- Pterostichus seticeps (Straneo, 1984)
- Pterostichus sharanus (Straneo, 1984)
- Pterostichus variseta (Straneo, 1984)
- Pterostichus viridellus Straneo, 1984

Subgenus Falsargutor Kryzhanovskij, 1983

- Pterostichus kataevi Kryzhanovskij, 1989
- Pterostichus ponticus Kirschenhofer, 1987
- Pterostichus pseudopedius Reitter, 1887

Subgenus Feronidius Jeannel, 1942

- Pterostichus brevipennis (Chevrolat, 1840)
- Pterostichus fornicatus (Kolenati, 1845)
- Pterostichus hungaricus (Dejean, 1828)
- Pterostichus incommodus Schaum, 1858
- Pterostichus melas (Creutzer, 1799)

Subgenus Feronina Casey, 1918

- Pterostichus barri Bousquet, 2006
- Pterostichus palmi Schaeffer, 1910

Subgenus Fukienostichus Lafer, 1983

- Pterostichus shaovuensis Jedlicka, 1956

Subgenus Gastrosticta Casey, 1918

- Pterostichus enodis Bousquet, 1992
- Pterostichus mutoides Bousquet, 1992
- Pterostichus obesulus LeConte, 1873
- Pterostichus ophryoderus (Chaudoir, 1878)
- Pterostichus punctiventris (Chaudoir, 1878)
- Pterostichus putus Casey, 1913
- Pterostichus sayanus Csiki, 1930
- Pterostichus subacutus (Casey, 1918)
- Pterostichus tumescens LeConte, 1863
- Pterostichus ventralis (Say, 1823)

Subgenus Georgeballius Habu, 1984

- Pterostichus hoplites (Bates, 1883)

Subgenus Gutta Wrase & J.Schmidt, 2006

- Pterostichus adulterinus Wrase & J.Schmidt, 2006
- Pterostichus gaoligongensis Wrase & J.Schmidt, 2006
- Pterostichus kongshuhensis B.Gueorguiev, 2015
- Pterostichus phungaraziensis Wrase & J.Schmidt, 2006

Subgenus Haplomaseus Reitter, 1896

- Pterostichus abagonensis Reitter, 1896
- Pterostichus andreae (Tschitscherine, 1897)
- Pterostichus arator (Faldermann, 1836)
- Pterostichus armenus (Faldermann, 1836)
- Pterostichus astutus (Tschitscherine, 1903)
- Pterostichus balikliensis Hovorka & Skoupy, 2007
- Pterostichus caucasicola (Tschitscherine, 1893)
- Pterostichus caucasicus (Ménétriés, 1832)
- Pterostichus chasautianus Vysoky, 1984
- Pterostichus chydaeus (Tschitscherine, 1897)
- Pterostichus consanguineus (Chaudoir, 1878)
- Pterostichus cristicaudis Kurnakov, 1962
- Pterostichus denticaudis Kurnakov, 1962
- Pterostichus giresuni Jedlicka, 1965
- Pterostichus goriensis (Tschitscherine, 1897)
- Pterostichus heinzi Jedlicka, 1965
- Pterostichus ikizderensis Hovorka & Skoupy, 2007
- Pterostichus jugicola (Lutshnik, 1916)
- Pterostichus krulikovskyi (Lutshnik, 1933)
- Pterostichus meskheticus Belousov, 1991
- Pterostichus novotnyorum Vysoky, 1981
- Pterostichus olegi Belousov, 1991
- Pterostichus phaeus (Lutshnik, 1922)
- Pterostichus porcellus Kurnakov, 1962
- Pterostichus pseudoastutus Hovorka & Skoupy, 2007
- Pterostichus rousi Kirschenhofer, 1982
- Pterostichus skoupyi Hovorka & Skoupy, 2007
- Pterostichus staveni Hovorka & Skoupy, 2007
- Pterostichus tamsii (Dejean, 1831)
- Pterostichus tanjae Hovorka & Skoupy, 2007
- Pterostichus woronowi (Lutshnik, 1916)

Subgenus Haptotapinus Reitter, 1886

- Pterostichus aksekianus (Straneo, 1988)
- Pterostichus besucheti (Straneo, 1988)
- Pterostichus bythiniensis (Maran, 1944)
- Pterostichus crassiusculus (Chaudoir, 1868)
- Pterostichus dipojranus (Straneo, 1988)
- Pterostichus matchai (Jedlicka, 1930)
- Pterostichus oblongoparallelus Maran, 1932
- Pterostichus odontocnemis G.Müller, 1931
- Pterostichus orduensis (Straneo, 1988)
- Pterostichus pavani (Straneo, 1988)
- Pterostichus reissi G.Müller, 1931
- Pterostichus vseteckai (Maran, 1944)

Subgenus Huaius Tian; Huang; Chen & Ding, 2019

- Pterostichus caoi Tian; Huang; Chen & Ding, 2019
- Pterostichus hanwang Tian & He, 2020
- Pterostichus tiankeng Tian; Huang; Chen & Ding, 2019
- Pterostichus yuae Tian; Huang; Chen & Ding, 2019

Subgenus Hypherpes Chaudoir, 1838

- Pterostichus adoxus (Say, 1823)
- Pterostichus algidus LeConte, 1853
- Pterostichus amethystinus Mannerheim, 1843
- Pterostichus annosus Casey, 1913
- Pterostichus arcanus Casey, 1913
- Pterostichus baldwini (Casey, 1924)
- Pterostichus barbarinus Casey, 1913
- Pterostichus brachylobus Kavanaugh & LaBonte, 2006
- Pterostichus californicus (Dejean, 1828)
- Pterostichus canallatus Casey, 1913
- Pterostichus castaneus (Dejean, 1828)
- Pterostichus castanipes (Ménétriés, 1843)
- Pterostichus congestus (Ménétriés, 1843)
- Pterostichus craterensis (Hatch, 1949)
- Pterostichus crenicollis LeConte, 1873
- Pterostichus ecarinatus Hatch, 1936
- Pterostichus esuriens Casey, 1913
- Pterostichus gliscans Casey, 1913
- Pterostichus gracilior LeConte, 1873
- Pterostichus herculaneus Mannerheim, 1843
- Pterostichus hornii LeConte, 1873
- Pterostichus illustris LeConte, 1851
- Pterostichus inermis Fall, 1901
- Pterostichus isabellae LeConte, 1851
- Pterostichus jacobinus Casey, 1913
- Pterostichus laborans Casey, 1913
- Pterostichus lacertus Casey, 1913
- Pterostichus lama (Ménétriés, 1843)
- Pterostichus lassulus (Casey, 1920)
- Pterostichus lattini LaBonte, 2006
- Pterostichus luscus (Casey, 1918)
- Pterostichus menetriesii LeConte, 1873
- Pterostichus mercedianus (Casey, 1918)
- Pterostichus miscellus Casey, 1913
- Pterostichus morionides (Chaudoir, 1868)
- Pterostichus neobrunneus Lindroth, 1966
- Pterostichus nigrocaeruleus Van Dyke, 1926
- Pterostichus obsidianus Casey, 1913
- Pterostichus occultus Casey, 1913
- Pterostichus ordinarius Casey, 1913
- Pterostichus ovalipennis Casey, 1913
- Pterostichus panticulatus Casey, 1913
- Pterostichus pergracilis (Casey, 1920)
- Pterostichus planctus LeConte, 1853
- Pterostichus protensiformis (Casey, 1924)
- Pterostichus protractus LeConte, 1860
- Pterostichus restrictus (Casey, 1918)
- Pterostichus scutellaris LeConte, 1873
- Pterostichus sejungendus (Chaudoir, 1868)
- Pterostichus serripes (LeConte, 1875)
- Pterostichus setosus Hatch, 1951
- Pterostichus sierranus Casey, 1913
- Pterostichus sponsor Casey, 1913
- Pterostichus spraguei LeConte, 1873
- Pterostichus suffusus Casey, 1913
- Pterostichus tarsalis LeConte, 1873
- Pterostichus tristis (Dejean, 1828)
- Pterostichus tuberculofemoratus Hatch, 1936
- Pterostichus vandykei Schaeffer, 1910
- Pterostichus vicinus Mannerheim, 1843
- Pterostichus ybousqueti O.Berlov, 1999

Subgenus Jedlickaia Sciaky, 1997

- Pterostichus sterbai Jedlicka, 1934

Subgenus Koreonialoe Park & Kwon, 1996

- Pterostichus adatarasanus Sasakawa, 2005
- Pterostichus akitai Morita, 2004
- Pterostichus apiculatiphallus Nemoto, 1988
- Pterostichus asahinus Habu & Baba, 1960
- Pterostichus bellatrix (Tschitscherine, 1895)
- Pterostichus bifidiphallus Nemoto, 1988
- Pterostichus chokaisanus Sasakawa, 2009
- Pterostichus eboshiyamanus Sasakawa, 2009
- Pterostichus falcispinus Sasakawa, 2005
- Pterostichus fukube Sugimura, 2005
- Pterostichus gassanus Sasakawa, 2009
- Pterostichus gujoensis Toda, 2012
- Pterostichus ishikawai Nemoto, 1988
- Pterostichus ishikawaioides Sasakawa; J.L.Kim; J.K.Kim & Kubota, 2008
- Pterostichus isolatus Sasakawa; Kim & Kubota, 2005
- Pterostichus iwakiensis Sasakawa, 2009
- Pterostichus iwasakii Kasahara, 1990
- Pterostichus ixion (Tschitscherine, 1902)
- Pterostichus jiricola Sasakawa; J.L.Kim; J.K.Kim & Kubota, 2008
- Pterostichus kitakamisanus Sasakawa, 2005
- Pterostichus koheii Nakane, 1963
- Pterostichus kuraiyamanus Morita & Ohkawa, 2010
- Pterostichus kurikomasanus Sasakawa, 2005
- Pterostichus kuwolsanensis Li & Zhang, 2014
- Pterostichus macrogenys Bates, 1883
- Pterostichus microps Heyden, 1887
- Pterostichus miyazawai Morita & Ohkawa, 2009
- Pterostichus momuranus Morita; Ohkawa & Kurihara, 2013
- Pterostichus monolineatus Sasakawa; Mitsuduka & H.Ito, 2020
- Pterostichus nagasawai N.Ito & Ogai, 2015
- Pterostichus ohsawacavus Sasakawa, 2005
- Pterostichus opacipennis Jedlicka, 1934
- Pterostichus palgongsanus Nemoto, 1988
- Pterostichus shikatai Toda, 2012
- Pterostichus shinbodakensis Sasakawa & H.Ito, 2017
- Pterostichus shirakamisan Sasakawa, 2009
- Pterostichus shirakamisanus Sasakawa, 2005
- Pterostichus shojii Sugimura, 2006
- Pterostichus sumondakensis Sasakawa, 2005
- Pterostichus syleus Kirschenhofer, 1997
- Pterostichus taebaegsanus Nemoto, 1988
- Pterostichus takadateyamanus Sasakawa, 2009
- Pterostichus tanakai Ishida, 1964
- Pterostichus tateishiyamanus Sasakawa & H.Ito, 2017
- Pterostichus teretis Park & Kwon, 1996
- Pterostichus todai Morita & Kanie, 1997
- Pterostichus togyusanus Park & Kwon, 1996
- Pterostichus toyodai Morita & Kurosa, 1998
- Pterostichus uedaorum Morita & Hirasawa, 1996
- Pterostichus vicinus Park & Kwon, 1996
- Pterostichus woongbii Park & Kwon, 1996
- Pterostichus yahikosanus Sasakawa, 2009
- Pterostichus yamizosanus Sasakawa, 2005
- Pterostichus yorikoae Sugimura, 2007

Subgenus Kozyrevius O.Berlov, 1998

- Pterostichus militaris (Tschitscherine, 1893)

Subgenus Lamenius Bousquet, 1999

- Pterostichus caudicalis (Say, 1823)

Subgenus Lenapterus O.Berlov, 1996

- Pterostichus agonus G.Horn, 1880
- Pterostichus cancellatus (Motschulsky, 1860)
- Pterostichus costatus (Ménétriés, 1851)
- Pterostichus galae Farkac & Plutenko, 1996
- Pterostichus gromykoi Sundukov, 2005
- Pterostichus marginatus Matsumura, 1911
- Pterostichus punctatissimus (Randall, 1838)
- Pterostichus rugosipennis Jedlicka, 1932
- Pterostichus saxicola (Tschitscherine, 1899)
- Pterostichus vermiculosus (Ménétriés, 1851)

Subgenus Leptoferonia Casey, 1918

- Pterostichus angustus (Dejean, 1828)
- Pterostichus beyeri Van Dyke, 1926
- Pterostichus blodgettensis Will, 2007
- Pterostichus caligans G.Horn, 1891
- Pterostichus cochlearis Hacker, 1968
- Pterostichus deino Will, 2007
- Pterostichus enyo Will, 2007
- Pterostichus falli Van Dyke, 1926
- Pterostichus fenyesi Csiki, 1930
- Pterostichus fuchsi Schaeffer, 1910
- Pterostichus hackerae Will, 2016
- Pterostichus hatchi Hacker, 1968
- Pterostichus humilis Casey, 1913
- Pterostichus idahoae Csiki, 1930
- Pterostichus inanis G.Horn, 1891
- Pterostichus infernalis Hatch, 1936
- Pterostichus inopinus (Casey, 1918)
- Pterostichus lobatus Hacker, 1968
- Pterostichus marinensis Hacker, 1968
- Pterostichus mattolensis Hacker, 1968
- Pterostichus pemphredo Will, 2007
- Pterostichus pumilus Casey, 1913
- Pterostichus rothi (Hatch, 1951)
- Pterostichus sphodrinus LeConte, 1863
- Pterostichus stapedius Hacker, 1968
- Pterostichus trinitensis Hacker, 1968
- Pterostichus yosemitensis Hacker, 1968

Subgenus Lianoe Gozis, 1882

- Pterostichus amanoi Nakane, 1968
- Pterostichus arribasi Ortuño, 1991
- Pterostichus asturicus (Jeanne, 1966)
- Pterostichus cordatissimus (Straneo, 1937)
- Pterostichus drescoi Nègre, 1957
- Pterostichus dufourii (Dejean, 1828)
- Pterostichus microphthalmus Delarouzée, 1857
- Pterostichus muelleri (Straneo, 1936)
- Pterostichus nadari (Vuillefroy, 1893)
- Pterostichus nakamiyorinus Morita; Ohkawa & Kurihara, 2013
- Pterostichus rousselli Colas, 1963
- Pterostichus sakagamii Morita, 2001
- Pterostichus sudrei Sainte-Claire Deville, 1922

Subgenus Lyrothorax Chaudoir, 1838

- Pterostichus amagisanus Tanaka & Ishida, 1972
- Pterostichus caspius (Ménétriés, 1832)
- Pterostichus eoyoritomus Sasakawa, 2009
- Pterostichus fujitai Tanaka & Ishida, 1972
- Pterostichus yoritomus Bates, 1873

Subgenus Megabea Sciaky, 1997

- Pterostichus tienmushanus Sciaky, 1997

Subgenus Melanius Bonelli, 1810

- Pterostichus aterrimus (Herbst, 1784)
- Pterostichus castor Goulet & Bousquet, 1983
- Pterostichus corvinus (Dejean, 1828)
- Pterostichus ebeninus (Dejean, 1828)
- Pterostichus elongatus (Duftschmid, 1812)
- Pterostichus licenti Jedlicka, 1939
- Pterostichus noguchii Bates, 1873

Subgenus Metallophilus Chaudoir, 1838

- Pterostichus dandongensis Kirschenhofer, 1997
- Pterostichus interruptus (Dejean, 1828)
- Pterostichus kamtschaticus Motschulsky, 1860
- Pterostichus mirus (Tschitscherine, 1894)
- Pterostichus orion (Tschitscherine, 1901)
- Pterostichus pfizenmayeri Poppius, 1906
- Pterostichus rugosus (Gebler, 1823)
- Pterostichus sublaevis (J.Sahlberg, 1880)

Subgenus Micronialoe Park; Kwon & Lafer, 1996

- Pterostichus bifoveolatus Park; Kwon & Lafer, 1996
- Pterostichus chogyesanus Park; Kwon & Lafer, 1996
- Pterostichus kaniei Morita, 2005

Subgenus Monoferonia Casey, 1918

- Pterostichus carolinus Darlington, 1932
- Pterostichus diligendus (Chaudoir, 1868)
- Pterostichus mancus (LeConte, 1853)
- Pterostichus primus Darlington, 1932

Subgenus Morphohaptoderus Tschitscherine, 1898

- Pterostichus bowanus Sciaky, 1997
- Pterostichus cervenkai Sciaky, 1994
- Pterostichus chungkingi Jedlicka, 1932
- Pterostichus confucius Sciaky & Wrase, 1997
- Pterostichus dentellus Facchini & Sciaky, 2003
- Pterostichus dundai Sciaky, 1994
- Pterostichus emei Sciaky, 1994
- Pterostichus expeditus (Tschitscherine, 1898)
- Pterostichus geberti Sciaky & Wrase, 1997
- Pterostichus giacomazzoi Sciaky, 1994
- Pterostichus gongga Sciaky, 1997
- Pterostichus guizhouensis Sciaky, 1997
- Pterostichus huashanus Sciaky, 1994
- Pterostichus hubeicus Facchini & Sciaky, 2003
- Pterostichus irideus Sciaky, 1994
- Pterostichus janatai Sciaky & Wrase, 1997
- Pterostichus kalabi Sciaky, 1994
- Pterostichus kucerai Sciaky, 1997
- Pterostichus lingshanus Sciaky & Wrase, 1997
- Pterostichus maximus Tschitscherine, 1889
- Pterostichus megaloderus Sciaky, 1994
- Pterostichus ming Sciaky & Wrase, 1997
- Pterostichus miroslavi Sciaky & Wrase, 1997
- Pterostichus muellermotzfeldi Wrase & J.Schmidt, 2006
- Pterostichus parvicollis Sciaky & Wrase, 1997
- Pterostichus pseudoplatyderus Sciaky, 1994
- Pterostichus saueri Sciaky, 1994
- Pterostichus schuelkei Sciaky & Wrase, 1997
- Pterostichus shennongjianus Facchini & Sciaky, 2003
- Pterostichus straneellus Jedlicka, 1938
- Pterostichus toledanoi Facchini & Sciaky, 2003
- Pterostichus wenxianensis Allegro & Sciaky, 2010
- Pterostichus yulongshanensis Sciaky, 1997

Subgenus Myosodus Fischer von Waldheim, 1823

- Pterostichus aapsorum Belousov, 1991
- Pterostichus aibgensis Starck, 1890
- Pterostichus avaricus Abdurakhmanov & Kryzhanovskij, 1983
- Pterostichus batesi (Tschitscherine, 1894)
- Pterostichus buglaniensis Kirschenhofer, 1981
- Pterostichus filipjevi (Lutshnik, 1928)
- Pterostichus ingusha (Lutshnik, 1928)
- Pterostichus kiritshenkoi (Lutshnik, 1928)
- Pterostichus lacunosus (Chaudoir, 1844)
- Pterostichus lutshnikianus Bogachev & Kurnakov, 1958
- Pterostichus nivicola (Ménétriés, 1832)
- Pterostichus ordinatus (Fischer von Waldheim, 1823)
- Pterostichus rudestriatus (Reitter, 1883)
- Pterostichus schoenherri Faldermann, 1836
- Pterostichus sodalicius Heyden, 1885
- Pterostichus starcki Heyden, 1885
- Pterostichus stoeckleini (Straneo, 1941)
- Pterostichus svanicus (Lutshnik, 1922)
- Pterostichus swaneticus (Reitter, 1883)
- Pterostichus variabilis (Ménétriés, 1832)
- Pterostichus zamotajlovi Belousov, 1991

Subgenus Neohaptoderus Tschitscherine, 1898

- Pterostichus berezowskii (Tschitscherine, 1898)
- Pterostichus catei Sciaky & Wrase, 1997
- Pterostichus comorus Jedlicka, 1932
- Pterostichus gravis Jedlicka, 1939
- Pterostichus haesitatus Fairmaire, 1889
- Pterostichus ignavus (Tschitscherine, 1897)
- Pterostichus jureceki (Jedlicka, 1936)
- Pterostichus kleinfeldianus Sciaky & Wrase, 1997
- Pterostichus komalus (Jedlicka, 1936)
- Pterostichus maderi Jedlicka, 1938
- Pterostichus molopsoides Jedlicka, 1934
- Pterostichus montigena (Tschitscherine, 1898)
- Pterostichus mundus Jedlicka, 1938
- Pterostichus oreophilus (Tschitscherine, 1898)
- Pterostichus orestes (Jedlicka, 1936)
- Pterostichus sinicus (Tschitscherine, 1897)
- Pterostichus szetschuanensis Tschitscherine, 1889
- Pterostichus yunnanensis Jedlicka, 1934

Subgenus Nialoe Tanaka, 1958

- Pterostichus asymmetricus Bates, 1883
- Pterostichus basilobatus Sasakawa, 2005
- Pterostichus biexcisus Straneo, 1955
- Pterostichus bisetosus (Straneo, 1938)
- Pterostichus brunneipennis Straneo, 1955
- Pterostichus carsticus Kasahara & Y.Ito, 1989
- Pterostichus chujoi Habu, 1959
- Pterostichus cristatoides Straneo, 1955
- Pterostichus daihizanus Ishida, 1968
- Pterostichus daisenicus Ishida, 1958
- Pterostichus dandonis Kasahara, 1989
- Pterostichus enasanus Morita, 2007
- Pterostichus fujimurai Habu, 1958
- Pterostichus fujisanus Tanaka & Suga, 1972
- Pterostichus fumikoae Kurosa, 2019
- Pterostichus hakusanus Kasahara, 1989
- Pterostichus hekosanensis Sasakawa, 2020
- Pterostichus himifuriho Morita, 2007
- Pterostichus hiraii Morita, 2015
- Pterostichus hirobane Habu & Baba, 1958
- Pterostichus hozumii Ishida, 1961
- Pterostichus ikukoae Morita, 2007
- Pterostichus ishizukai Kasahara, 1995
- Pterostichus isumiensis Kasahara & Saito, 1997
- Pterostichus janoi Jedlicka, 1952
- Pterostichus jogaesanensis Lafer; Paik & Park, 1996
- Pterostichus katashinensis Habu, 1958
- Pterostichus kaya Morita, 2019
- Pterostichus kongosanus Nakane, 1963
- Pterostichus latistylis Tanaka, 1958
- Pterostichus masahiroi Kasahara, 1988
- Pterostichus masatakai Morita, 2007
- Pterostichus mirificus Bates, 1883
- Pterostichus mitoyamanus Tanaka, 1971
- Pterostichus musashiensis Kasahara, 1993
- Pterostichus nakanei Straneo, 1955
- Pterostichus naokii Morita, 2003
- Pterostichus napaea Kasahara, 1988
- Pterostichus nishiyamai Kasahara, 1986
- Pterostichus ogaensis Morita, 1995
- Pterostichus ohbayashii Ishida, 1968
- Pterostichus ohdaisanus Nakane, 1963
- Pterostichus ohkurai Morita, 1996
- Pterostichus okutamae Tanaka, 1963
- Pterostichus omogoensis Nakane, 1972
- Pterostichus ompoensis Jedlicka, 1932
- Pterostichus opaculus N.Ito, 2010
- Pterostichus ovaliphallus Sasakawa, 2005
- Pterostichus parkwon Davies, 2004
- Pterostichus praedo (Tschitscherine, 1901)
- Pterostichus rhanis (Tschitscherine, 1902)
- Pterostichus ryoheii Morita, 2012
- Pterostichus ryomoensis Morita & Suda, 2007
- Pterostichus satoi Ishida, 1961
- Pterostichus shibatai Ishida, 1961
- Pterostichus shotaroi Morita, 1987
- Pterostichus sincerus Park & Kwon, 1996
- Pterostichus spiculifer Bates, 1883
- Pterostichus sugimurai Morita, 2007
- Pterostichus tahirai Kasahara, 1992
- Pterostichus takahashii Ishida, 1958
- Pterostichus tanakaorum Morita & Ohkura, 1988
- Pterostichus taoi Kasahara, 1993
- Pterostichus tokejii Yoshida & Tanaka, 1960
- Pterostichus tottoriensis Morita, 2003
- Pterostichus tsurugiyamanus Habu, 1959
- Pterostichus uchiyamai Morita, 1987
- Pterostichus uenoi Straneo, 1955
- Pterostichus watanabei Nakane, 1960
- Pterostichus yamashitai Morita, 2019
- Pterostichus yanoi Jedlicka, 1953
- Pterostichus yatsuensis Straneo, 1955
- Pterostichus yokohamae Straneo in Nakane, 1979

Subgenus Oreolyperus Tschitscherine, 1901

- Pterostichus heptapotamicus (Lutshnik, 1927)
- Pterostichus korolkowi (Tschitscherine, 1901)
- Pterostichus necessarius (Tschitscherine, 1894)
- Pterostichus regeli (Tschitscherine, 1894)

Subgenus Oreophilus Chaudoir, 1838

- Pterostichus alberti (Jeannel, 1942)
- Pterostichus cribratus (Dejean, 1828)
- Pterostichus dubius Heer, 1838
- Pterostichus duratii A. & G.B.Villa, 1835
- Pterostichus externepunctatus (Dejean, 1828)
- Pterostichus flavofemoratus (Dejean, 1828)
- Pterostichus franzi Nègre, 1955
- Pterostichus ienishteai Nitzu, 1988
- Pterostichus impressus (Fairmaire & Laboulbène, 1854)
- Pterostichus jurinei (Panzer, 1802)
- Pterostichus morio (Duftschmid, 1812)
- Pterostichus multipunctatus (Dejean, 1828)
- Pterostichus parnassius Schaum, 1859
- Pterostichus paulini (Vuillefroy, 1868)
- Pterostichus planiusculus (Chaudoir, 1859)
- Pterostichus rufipennis Baudi di Selve, 1889
- Pterostichus spinolae (Dejean, 1828)
- Pterostichus variolatus (Dejean, 1828)
- Pterostichus xatartii (Dejean, 1828)
- Pterostichus yvanii (Dejean, 1828)

Subgenus Oreoplatysma Jakobson, 1907

- Pterostichus abishirensis Belousov, 1991
- Pterostichus araraticus Kirschenhofer, 1987
- Pterostichus asinubas Davies, 2004
- Pterostichus belizini (Lutshnik, 1933)
- Pterostichus belousovi Kryzhanovskij, 1989
- Pterostichus borcka Jedlicka, 1963
- Pterostichus capitolinus Kurnakov, 1962
- Pterostichus casaleianus Kirschenhofer, 1991
- Pterostichus cecchiniae (Jakobson, 1907)
- Pterostichus chefsuricus Reitter, 1896
- Pterostichus colchicus (Chaudoir, 1850)
- Pterostichus cordifer Reitter, 1896
- Pterostichus cunibakus Davies, 2004
- Pterostichus daghestanus Reitter, 1896
- Pterostichus depressidorsis Reitter, 1896
- Pterostichus faunus Kurnakov, 1962
- Pterostichus fencli Dvorak, 1995
- Pterostichus ghilarovi Kryzhanovskij, 1988
- Pterostichus jakobsonianus (Lutshnik, 1928)
- Pterostichus kadleci Dvorak, 1995
- Pterostichus kirschenblatti Kryzhanovskij, 1988
- Pterostichus koenigi (Reitter, 1887)
- Pterostichus krasnopolensis Kirschenhofer, 1987
- Pterostichus kvirensis Belousov, 1991
- Pterostichus lodosi Heinz, 1977
- Pterostichus mediocris Dvorak, 1995
- Pterostichus nikodymi Dvorak, 1995
- Pterostichus odvarkai Dvorak, 1995
- Pterostichus orman Jedlicka, 1963
- Pterostichus pasanauricus Kirschenhofer, 1987
- Pterostichus percontator Reitter, 1887
- Pterostichus planaticollis Kirschenhofer, 1987
- Pterostichus platyderus (Chaudoir, 1850)
- Pterostichus pulchellus (Faldermann, 1836)
- Pterostichus rousianus Kirschenhofer, 1987
- Pterostichus rubripalpis Csiki, 1930
- Pterostichus satunini (Tschitscherine, 1903)
- Pterostichus satyrus Kurnakov, 1962
- Pterostichus schodaicus Kirschenhofer, 1987
- Pterostichus setosicus Davies, 2004
- Pterostichus sojaki Kirschenhofer, 1987
- Pterostichus stomoides (Chaudoir, 1868)
- Pterostichus strasseri Reitter, 1898
- Pterostichus tamarae Wrase & Kirschenhofer, 1991
- Pterostichus validiceps Reitter, 1887
- Pterostichus zolotarewi Reitter, 1911

Subgenus Orientostichus Sciaky & Allegro, 2013

- Pterostichus chinensis (Jedlicka, 1962)
- Pterostichus curtatus Fairmaire, 1886
- Pterostichus davidi (Tschitscherine, 1897)
- Pterostichus deceptrix (Tschitscherine, 1898)
- Pterostichus distinctissimus Jedlicka, 1940
- Pterostichus ferreroi Straneo, 1989
- Pterostichus gallopavo Sciaky & Wrase, 1997
- Pterostichus lesticoides (Straneo, 1939)
- Pterostichus machulkai Jedlicka, 1931
- Pterostichus perlutus Jedlicka, 1938
- Pterostichus prattii Bates, 1890
- Pterostichus pulcher Sciaky & Allegro, 2013
- Pterostichus semirugosus (Andrewes, 1947)
- Pterostichus simillimus Fairmaire, 1886
- Pterostichus tachongi Jedlicka, 1936

Subgenus Orsonjohnsonus Hatch, 1933

- Pterostichus johnsoni Ulke, 1889

Subgenus Paraferonia Casey, 1918

- Pterostichus lubricus LeConte, 1853

Subgenus Parahaptoderus Jeanne, 1969

- Pterostichus bielzii (Fuss, 1858)
- Pterostichus brevis (Duftschmid, 1812)
- Pterostichus vecors (Tschitscherine, 1897)

Subgenus Paralianoe Ishida, 1958

- Pterostichus kiiensis Morita & Ohkura, 1988

Subgenus Parapterostichus Desbrochers des Loges, 1906

- Pterostichus grajus (Dejean, 1828)
- Pterostichus justusii W.Redtenbacher, 1842
- Pterostichus nodicornis (Fairmaire & Laboulbène, 1854)
- Pterostichus schaschli (Marseul, 1880)

Subgenus Petrophilus Chaudoir, 1838

- Pterostichus abnormis (J.Sahlberg, 1880)
- Pterostichus acutidens (Fairmaire, 1888)
- Pterostichus alexandrovi Lafer, 1979
- Pterostichus alexeji Zamotajlov & Kryzhanovskij, 1992
- Pterostichus altaianus Jedlicka, 1958
- Pterostichus altaicus (Germar, 1823)
- Pterostichus arsenjevi Lafer, 1979
- Pterostichus bungei (Tschitscherine, 1894)
- Pterostichus calvitarsis Breit, 1912
- Pterostichus chechcirensis Lafer, 1979
- Pterostichus chinkiangensis Kirschenhofer, 1991
- Pterostichus coracinus (Newman, 1838)
- Pterostichus dauricus (Gebler, 1832)
- Pterostichus dilutipes (Motschulsky, 1844)
- Pterostichus elmbergi Poppius, 1908
- Pterostichus eximius A.Morawitz, 1862
- Pterostichus fallettii Sciaky, 1996
- Pterostichus findelii (Dejean, 1828)
- Pterostichus foveolatus (Duftschmid, 1812)
- Pterostichus glaferi O. & E.Berlov, 1996
- Pterostichus iberlovi O.Berlov, 1996
- Pterostichus jungens (Tschitscherine, 1893)
- Pterostichus jurecekianus Maran, 1940
- Pterostichus kokeilii L.Miller, 1850
- Pterostichus kurentzovi Lafer, 1979
- Pterostichus kvanmobongus Lafer, 2011
- Pterostichus lachrymosus (Newman, 1838)
- Pterostichus levadensis Lafer, 1979
- Pterostichus magoides (Straneo, 1937)
- Pterostichus magus (Mannerheim, 1825)
- Pterostichus maryseae Sun & Shi, 2018
- Pterostichus melanarius (Illiger, 1798)
- Pterostichus melanodes (Chaudoir, 1878)
- Pterostichus mellyi (Gebler, 1843)
- Pterostichus montanus (Motschulsky, 1844)
- Pterostichus monticoloides Shilenkov in Kryzhanovskij et al., 1995
- Pterostichus mroczkowskii Lafer, 2011
- Pterostichus nigellus A.Morawitz, 1862
- Pterostichus novus Straneo, 1944
- Pterostichus odaesanensis Lafer, 2011
- Pterostichus pawlowskii Lafer, 2011
- Pterostichus pertinax (Tschitscherine, 1895)
- Pterostichus petulans Jedlicka, 1938
- Pterostichus poppiusi (Semenov, 1906)
- Pterostichus probus Park & Kwon, 1996
- Pterostichus procax A.Morawitz, 1862
- Pterostichus rasilis Park & Kwon, 1996
- Pterostichus relictus (Newman, 1838)
- Pterostichus robustistylis Sasakawa, 2005
- Pterostichus schoenmanni Kirschenhofer, 1991
- Pterostichus sejunctus Bates, 1883
- Pterostichus septentrionis (Chaudoir, 1868)
- Pterostichus seriatus (Chaudoir, 1850)
- Pterostichus seungmoi Park & Kwon, 1996
- Pterostichus shingarevi Lafer, 1979
- Pterostichus silvestris Sun & Shi, 2018
- Pterostichus songoricus (Motschulsky, 1845)
- Pterostichus stygicus (Say, 1823)
- Pterostichus subaeneus (Chaudoir, 1850)
- Pterostichus sungariensis Lafer, 1979
- Pterostichus sutschanensis Jedlicka, 1962
- Pterostichus tatianae E.Berlov, 1996
- Pterostichus thunbergi A.Morawitz, 1862
- Pterostichus tomensis (Gebler, 1847)
- Pterostichus triseriatus (Gebler, 1847)
- Pterostichus tschitscherinianus (Jakobson, 1907)
- Pterostichus tuberifer Sasakawa, 2006
- Pterostichus tundrae (Tschitscherine, 1894)
- Pterostichus turanensis Jedlicka, 1959
- Pterostichus uralensis (Motschulsky, 1850)
- Pterostichus urengaicus Jurecek, 1924
- Pterostichus vladivostokensis Lafer, 1979

Subgenus Phaenoraphis Tschitscherine, 1901

- Pterostichus acuspina (Tschitscherine, 1901)
- Pterostichus peninsularis Park & Kwon, 1996
- Pterostichus sagittus Park, 2013

Subgenus Phonias Gozis, 1886

- Pterostichus apfelbecki Csiki, 1908
- Pterostichus burkhan Berlov & Anichtchenko, 2005
- Pterostichus corrusculus LeConte, 1873
- Pterostichus datshenkoae Sundukov, 2013
- Pterostichus defossus Bates, 1883
- Pterostichus diligens (Sturm, 1824)
- Pterostichus dostali Kirschenhofer, 1981
- Pterostichus eobius (Tschitscherine, 1899)
- Pterostichus femoralis (Kirby, 1837)
- Pterostichus gyrosus (Motschulsky, 1866)
- Pterostichus innshanensis Jedlicka, 1960
- Pterostichus jankowskyi (Tschitscherine, 1897)
- Pterostichus kutensis Poppius, 1905
- Pterostichus liodactylus (Tschitscherine, 1898)
- Pterostichus longinquus Bates, 1873
- Pterostichus longipennis Straneo, 1942
- Pterostichus monostigma (Tschitscherine, 1898)
- Pterostichus morawitzianus (Lutshnik, 1922)
- Pterostichus neglectus A.Morawitz, 1862
- Pterostichus ovoideus (Sturm, 1824)
- Pterostichus patruelis (Dejean, 1831)
- Pterostichus perisi Novoa, 1979
- Pterostichus ripensis (Motschulsky, 1866)
- Pterostichus sasajii Morita, 2007
- Pterostichus setipes (Tschitscherine, 1898)
- Pterostichus sotkaensis Jedlicka, 1958
- Pterostichus strenuus (Panzer, 1796)
- Pterostichus stricticollis (Solsky, 1874)
- Pterostichus subitus Csiki, 1930
- Pterostichus taksonyis Csiki, 1930
- Pterostichus ussuriensis (Tschitscherine, 1897)

Subgenus Platypterus Chaudoir, 1838

- Pterostichus dilatatus A. & G.B.Villa, 1835
- Pterostichus lineatopunctatus L.Miller, 1850
- Pterostichus lombardus K.Daniel, 1900
- Pterostichus ottomanus Apfelbeck, 1908
- Pterostichus panzeri (Panzer, 1802)
- Pterostichus truncatus (Dejean, 1828)
- Pterostichus ziegleri (Duftschmid, 1812)

Subgenus Platysma Bonelli, 1810

- Pterostichus chotanensis (Tschitscherine, 1893)
- Pterostichus cordaticollis Heyden, 1884
- Pterostichus crenulatopunctatus (R.F.Sahlberg, 1844)
- Pterostichus eschscholtzii (Germar, 1823)
- Pterostichus galinae Kabak, 1992
- Pterostichus insignicollis (Tschitscherine, 1893)
- Pterostichus leptis Bates, 1883
- Pterostichus niger (Schaller, 1783)
- Pterostichus planicola (Tschitscherine, 1899)
- Pterostichus sachtlebeni Jedlicka, 1962
- Pterostichus turcomannicus Motschulsky, 1850

Subgenus Plectes Fischer von Waldheim, 1822

- Pterostichus consors (Tschitscherine, 1893)
- Pterostichus drescheri (Fischer von Waldheim, 1817)

Subgenus Pledarus Motschulsky, 1866

- Pterostichus gibbicollis (Motschulsky, 1844)
- Pterostichus larisae Sundukov, 2013
- Pterostichus lutschniki Jedlicka, 1962
- Pterostichus nigellatus Kirschenhofer, 1991

Subgenus Pseudethira Sciaky, 1996

- Pterostichus angoarnigi Morvan, 1994
- Pterostichus atrox (Andrewes, 1937)
- Pterostichus balachowskyi Morvan, 1972
- Pterostichus balu J.Schmidt, 2009
- Pterostichus bhutanensis Morvan, 1978
- Pterostichus brancuccii Straneo, 1982
- Pterostichus brevilama Straneo, 1989
- Pterostichus bureli Morvan, 1994
- Pterostichus chainapaani J.Schmidt, 2006
- Pterostichus championi Andrewes, 1926
- Pterostichus conaensis J.Schmidt & Tian, 2011
- Pterostichus deuvei Lassalle, 1985
- Pterostichus dhorpatanicus Straneo, 1977
- Pterostichus dolens (Tschitscherine, 1900)
- Pterostichus dorjulensis Morvan, 1978
- Pterostichus exochus Andrewes, 1930
- Pterostichus fritzhiekei J.Schmidt, 1994
- Pterostichus gagates (Hope, 1831)
- Pterostichus ganesh J.Schmidt, 2006
- Pterostichus ganja J.Schmidt, 1995
- Pterostichus gerdi J.Schmidt, 2009
- Pterostichus gobettii Straneo, 1983
- Pterostichus gompanus Straneo, 1983
- Pterostichus harmandi (Tschitscherine, 1900)
- Pterostichus hartmanni J.Schmidt, 1995
- Pterostichus hedkeinekus Morvan, 1995
- Pterostichus hoelli J.Schmidt, 2009
- Pterostichus immarginatus Straneo, 1977
- Pterostichus jaljaleensis J.Schmidt, 2009
- Pterostichus janbritoi Morvan, 1994
- Pterostichus juga J.Schmidt, 2006
- Pterostichus kadoudali Morvan, 1982
- Pterostichus kalo J.Schmidt, 2012
- Pterostichus kangchenjunga J.Schmidt, 2012
- Pterostichus keltiekus Morvan, 1981
- Pterostichus kleinfeldi Straneo, 1982
- Pterostichus kopetzi J.Schmidt, 2006
- Pterostichus leica J.Schmidt, 2012
- Pterostichus letensis Habu, 1973
- Pterostichus lugi Morvan, 1982
- Pterostichus makalu J.Schmidt, 2012
- Pterostichus matsumurai Habu, 1973
- Pterostichus mewakholensis J.Schmidt, 2012
- Pterostichus miehei J.Schmidt, 2006
- Pterostichus nepalensis Straneo, 1977
- Pterostichus nowitzkii (Tschitscherine, 1899)
- Pterostichus olafi J.Schmidt, 2006
- Pterostichus perlamatus Straneo, 1989
- Pterostichus pseudoharmandi Morvan, 1981
- Pterostichus pseudoplatysma Straneo, 1982
- Pterostichus raraensis Morvan, 1980
- Pterostichus rugosiceps J.Schmidt, 2012
- Pterostichus sagarmatha J.Schmidt, 2012
- Pterostichus santostamangi J.Schmidt, 2006
- Pterostichus schrettenbrunneri J.Schmidt, 2012
- Pterostichus thanglaensis J.Schmidt, 2012
- Pterostichus tulobalu J.Schmidt, 2009
- Pterostichus weigeli J.Schmidt, 2006
- Pterostichus weiperti J.Schmidt, 2006
- Pterostichus wittmeri Morvan, 1978

Subgenus Pseudoferonina Ball, 1965

- Pterostichus amadeus Bousquet, 2012
- Pterostichus bousqueti Bergdahl in Bergdahl & Kavanaugh, 2011
- Pterostichus campbelli Bousquet, 1985
- Pterostichus humidulus (Van Dyke, 1943)
- Pterostichus lanei Van Dyke, 1926
- Pterostichus lolo Bergdahl in Bergdahl & Kavanaugh, 2011
- Pterostichus shulli (Hatch, 1949)
- Pterostichus smetanai Bousquet, 1985
- Pterostichus spathifer Bousquet, 1992

Subgenus Pseudohaptoderus Tschitscherine, 1888

- Pterostichus aemiliae Facchini & Sciaky, 2000
- Pterostichus jugivagus (Tschitscherine, 1898)
- Pterostichus ssemenovi Tschitscherine, 1888

Subgenus Pseudomaseus Chaudoir, 1838

- Pterostichus aimaki Jedlicka, 1968
- Pterostichus ambigenus Bates, 1883
- Pterostichus anthracinus (Illiger, 1798)
- Pterostichus basipunctatus Straneo, 1955
- Pterostichus carri Angus; Galian; Wrase & Chaladze, 2009
- Pterostichus chujoiellus Jedlicka, 1962
- Pterostichus fuscicornis (Reiche & Saulcy, 1855)
- Pterostichus gracilis (Dejean, 1828)
- Pterostichus hejkali B.Gueorguiev & Skoupy, 2011
- Pterostichus koslovi Solodovnikov, 2001
- Pterostichus luctuosus (Dejean, 1828)
- Pterostichus michailovi Wrase, 1992
- Pterostichus minor (Gyllenhal, 1827)
- Pterostichus mukdenensis Breit, 1933
- Pterostichus nigrita (Paykull, 1790)
- Pterostichus oenotrius Ravizza, 1975
- Pterostichus piceolus (Chaudoir, 1850)
- Pterostichus rhaeticus Heer, 1837
- Pterostichus rotundangulus A.Morawitz, 1862
- Pterostichus tenuis (Casey, 1924)
- Pterostichus tsukubasanus Kasahara, 1988

Subgenus Pseudorambousekiella Schweiger, 1967

- Pterostichus montisdeorum Schweiger, 1967

Subgenus Pseudorites Ganglbauer, 1891

- Pterostichus nicaeensis (A. & G.B.Villa, 1835)

Subgenus Pseudosteropus Chaudoir, 1838

- Pterostichus illigeri (Panzer, 1802)
- Pterostichus schmidtii (Chaudoir, 1838)

Subgenus Pterostichus Bonelli, 1810

- Pterostichus andreinii Dodero, 1922
- Pterostichus auratus Heer, 1837
- Pterostichus bischoffianus Jedlicka, 1936
- Pterostichus bruckii Schaum, 1859
- Pterostichus cantalicus (Chaudoir, 1868)
- Pterostichus cristatus (L.Dufour, 1820)
- Pterostichus devillei Puel, 1924
- Pterostichus dux L.Schaufuss, 1862
- Pterostichus epiroticus Csiki, 1930
- Pterostichus fasciatopunctatus (Creutzer, 1799)
- Pterostichus focarilei Casale & Giachino, 1985
- Pterostichus funestes Csiki, 1930
- Pterostichus hagenbachii Sturm, 1824
- Pterostichus honnoratii (Dejean, 1828)
- Pterostichus impressicollis (Fairmaire & Laboulbène, 1854)
- Pterostichus lanista (Tschitscherine, 1898)
- Pterostichus lasserrei (Dejean, 1828)
- Pterostichus latifianus Apfelbeck, 1906
- Pterostichus lumensis Apfelbeck, 1905
- Pterostichus malissorum Apfelbeck, 1905
- Pterostichus meisteri Reitter, 1885
- Pterostichus merklii (J.Frivaldszky, 1879)
- Pterostichus micans Heer, 1838
- Pterostichus pedemontanus Ganglbauer, 1891
- Pterostichus pentheri Apfelbeck, 1918
- Pterostichus phaeopus (Sainte-Claire Deville, 1903)
- Pterostichus reiseri Ganglbauer, 1889
- Pterostichus rhilensis Rottenberg, 1874
- Pterostichus ruffoi Sciaky, 1984
- Pterostichus rufipes (Dejean, 1828)
- Pterostichus rutilans (Dejean, 1828)
- Pterostichus sacheri I.Frivaldszky von Frivald, 1865
- Pterostichus vagepunctatus Heer, 1837
- Pterostichus walteri Reitter, 1883

Subgenus Rambousekiella Knirsch, 1925

- Pterostichus ledenikensis (Knirsch, 1925)

Subgenus Rhagadus Motschulsky, 1866

- Pterostichus brittoni Habu, 1958
- Pterostichus glabripennis Jedlicka, 1962
- Pterostichus harponifer Tanaka, 1987
- Pterostichus ishiii Morita; Kurosa & Mori, 2009
- Pterostichus kalhys (Motschulsky, 1866)
- Pterostichus kimurai Morita, 1994
- Pterostichus komiyai Morita, 2007
- Pterostichus laevipunctatus Tschitscherine, 1889
- Pterostichus latemarginatus (Straneo, 1936)
- Pterostichus microcephalus (Motschulsky, 1861)
- Pterostichus modicellus (Tschitscherine, 1897)
- Pterostichus mundatus Jedlicka, 1940
- Pterostichus nimbatidius (Chaudoir, 1878)
- Pterostichus polygenus Bates, 1883
- Pterostichus satsumanus Habu, 1958
- Pterostichus solskyi (Chaudoir, 1878)
- Pterostichus takaosanus Habu, 1958
- Pterostichus thorectes Bates, 1873
- Pterostichus thorectoides Jedlicka, 1958

Subgenus Sinoreophilus Sciaky, 1996

- Pterostichus potanini Tschitscherine, 1889
- Pterostichus scalptus Sciaky & Wrase, 1997
- Pterostichus strigosus Sciaky & Wrase, 1997
- Pterostichus validior Tschitscherine, 1889

Subgenus Sinosteropus Sciaky, 1994

- Pterostichus barbarae Sciaky & Facchini, 2003
- Pterostichus carinatus Sciaky & Facchini, 2003
- Pterostichus cathaicus Sciaky, 1994
- Pterostichus curvatus Sciaky & Facchini, 2003
- Pterostichus horstweiperti J.Schmidt & Guorguiev, 2013
- Pterostichus jaechianus Sciaky & Facchini, 2003
- Pterostichus jani Sciaky & Facchini, 2003
- Pterostichus latitemporis Sciaky & Wrase, 1997
- Pterostichus microbus Sciaky & Facchini, 2003
- Pterostichus perhoplites J.Schmidt & Tian, 2011
- Pterostichus pseudobarbarae Sciaky & Facchini, 2003
- Pterostichus pseudojugivagus J.Schmidt & Tian, 2011
- Pterostichus pseudorotundus Sciaky & Facchini, 2003
- Pterostichus pseudosinensis Sciaky & Facchini, 2003
- Pterostichus rotundus Sciaky, 1994
- Pterostichus schneideri Sciaky & Facchini, 2003
- Pterostichus scuticollis (Fairmaire, 1889)
- Pterostichus septemtrionalis Sciaky & Facchini, 2003
- Pterostichus sinensis Jedlicka, 1962
- Pterostichus triangularis Sciaky & Facchini, 2003
- Pterostichus wrasei Sciaky & Facchini, 2003

Subgenus Sphodroferonia Kasahara & Y.Ito, 1987

- Pterostichus abaciformis Straneo, 1955
- Pterostichus arcuaticarinatus Kasahara, 1986
- Pterostichus audax (Tschitscherine, 1895)
- Pterostichus bilobatus N.Ito, 2010
- Pterostichus bisulcitarsis N.Ito, 2012
- Pterostichus confusianus N.Ito, 2010
- Pterostichus constricticollis N.Ito, 2010
- Pterostichus esakii Ishida, 1959
- Pterostichus fenestratus Kasahara & Ohtani, 1989
- Pterostichus geojensis Sasakawa; Kim & Kubota, 2006
- Pterostichus gotoensis Kasahara & Matsumoto, 1990
- Pterostichus gracilitarsis N.Ito, 2010
- Pterostichus hikosanus Kasahara, 1994
- Pterostichus hisamatsui Ishida & Shibata, 1961
- Pterostichus imasakai Kasahara & Ohtani, 1988
- Pterostichus imitatorius N.Ito, 2010
- Pterostichus ishizuchiensis Kasahara, 1985
- Pterostichus itoi Kasahara, 1986
- Pterostichus kosakai Morita, 1998
- Pterostichus koujitanakai N.Ito, 2010
- Pterostichus kyushuensis Habu, 1955
- Pterostichus laeviceps N.Ito, 2010
- Pterostichus macrocephalus Habu, 1955
- Pterostichus marginellus Sasakawa; Kim & Kim, 2006
- Pterostichus masatakayoshidai N.Ito, 2010
- Pterostichus masidai Ishida, 1959
- Pterostichus masumotoi Tanaka; Morita & Suga, 1987
- Pterostichus miyamai Kasahara & Y.Ito, 1987
- Pterostichus mosaicus Sasakawa, 2005
- Pterostichus mucronatus Straneo, 1955
- Pterostichus multinodosus Sasakawa; Kim & Kim, 2006
- Pterostichus namedai Morita, 2019
- Pterostichus nasui Kasahara, 1993
- Pterostichus nishidai Nakane, 1989
- Pterostichus obscurimpressus N.Ito, 2010
- Pterostichus okiensis Nakane, 1989
- Pterostichus orionis Jedlicka, 1962
- Pterostichus pachinus Bates, 1883
- Pterostichus platyocularis N.Ito, 2010
- Pterostichus platypennis N.Ito, 2010
- Pterostichus plesiomorphus Nemoto, 1989
- Pterostichus prominens N.Ito, 2010
- Pterostichus pseudopachinus Nakane, 1963
- Pterostichus punctatulus N.Ito, 2010
- Pterostichus punctibasalis N.Ito, 2012
- Pterostichus raptor (Tschitscherine, 1901)
- Pterostichus sakuragii N.Ito, 2010
- Pterostichus sculpturalis N.Ito, 2012
- Pterostichus scurra (Tschitscherine, 1901)
- Pterostichus scurroides Jedlicka, 1958
- Pterostichus sediorcrus Sasakawa & Kim, 2006
- Pterostichus seunglaki Park & Kwon, 1996
- Pterostichus shiibanus Habu, 1958
- Pterostichus sphodriformis Bates, 1873
- Pterostichus strigipennis N.Ito, 2012
- Pterostichus subabacipennis N.Ito, 2012
- Pterostichus sulcatus N.Ito, 2010
- Pterostichus suruganus Straneo in Nakane, 1979
- Pterostichus symmetricus Straneo, 1955
- Pterostichus taradakensis Kasahara & Ohtani, 1988
- Pterostichus tosanus Kasahara & Y.Ito, 1997
- Pterostichus touzalinioides Sasakawa; Kim & Kim, 2007
- Pterostichus tsurugaensis Ishida, 1959
- Pterostichus variicornis Sasakawa; Kim & Kim, 2007
- Pterostichus yakushimanus Nakane & Ishida, 1961
- Pterostichus yamajii Kasahara, 1993
- Pterostichus yoshidai Kasahara, 1985
- Pterostichus yoshikawai Ishida, 1959
- Pterostichus yoshiyukiitoi N.Ito, 2010

Subgenus Steropanus Fairmaire, 1889

- Pterostichus aequus (Andrewes, 1937)
- Pterostichus alveolatus Fedorenko, 2018
- Pterostichus asulcatus Fedorenko, 2018
- Pterostichus boriskataevi Fedorenko, 2020
- Pterostichus cavifrons Fedorenko, 2018
- Pterostichus deliciatus (Andrewes, 1937)
- Pterostichus felix (Andrewes, 1937)
- Pterostichus forticornis (Fairmaire, 1889)
- Pterostichus fossifrons Fedorenko, 2020
- Pterostichus glymmiger (Andrewes, 1937)
- Pterostichus infissus (Andrewes, 1937)
- Pterostichus mengtzei Jedlicka, 1931
- Pterostichus obliteratus Fedorenko, 2018
- Pterostichus pseudoglymmiger Fedorenko, 2020
- Pterostichus pseudoviolaceus Fedorenko, 2018
- Pterostichus securipenis Fedorenko, 2020
- Pterostichus sulcatipennis Fedorenko, 2018
- Pterostichus thailandensis (Morvan, 1992)
- Pterostichus thailandicus Straneo, 1989
- Pterostichus violaceus (Straneo, 1949)

Subgenus Steropus Dejean, 1821

- Pterostichus catalonicus J.Daniel in K. & J.Daniel, 1906
- Pterostichus ebenus (Quensel, 1806)
- Pterostichus ferreri (Español & Mateu, 1942)
- Pterostichus galaecianus Lauffer, 1909
- Pterostichus gallega (Fairmaire, 1859)
- Pterostichus ghilianii (Putzeys, 1845)
- Pterostichus insidatrix (Piochard de la Brûlerie, 1872)
- Pterostichus madidus (Fabricius, 1775)
- Pterostichus rifensis Antoine, 1933
- Pterostichus validus (Dejean, 1828)

Subgenus Tausternus Fedorenko, 2020

- Pterostichus hoii Fedorenko, 2020

Subgenus Tinautius Mateu, 1997

- Pterostichus exilis (Mateu, 2001)
- Pterostichus troglophilus (Mateu, 1997)

Subgenus Tschitscherinea Berg, 1898

- Pterostichus farkaci Sciaky, 1997
- Pterostichus filum (Tschitscherine, 1897)
- Pterostichus krali Sciaky, 1997
- Pterostichus mulensis Sciaky, 1997

Subgenus Tubuliphallus Sciaky & Allegro, 2013

- Pterostichus megacephalus Sciaky & Allegro, 2013

Subgenus Unitrichus Sciaky, 1997

- Pterostichus platyops Sciaky, 1997

Subgenus Vietosteropus Fedorenko, 2017

- Pterostichus abramovi Fedorenko, 2017
- Pterostichus anichkini Fedorenko, 2017
- Pterostichus annamita (Straneo, 1939)
- Pterostichus bidoupensis Fedorenko, 2017
- Pterostichus cavicollis Straneo, 1984
- Pterostichus chupanphan Fedorenko, 2017
- Pterostichus dalatensis Fedorenko, 2017
- Pterostichus gialaiensis Fedorenko, 2017
- Pterostichus honbaensis Fedorenko, 2017
- Pterostichus konchurang Fedorenko, 2017
- Pterostichus konplongensis Fedorenko, 2017
- Pterostichus kontumensis Fedorenko, 2017
- Pterostichus kuznetsovi Fedorenko, 2020
- Pterostichus ngoclinhensis Fedorenko, 2017
- Pterostichus ngokboci Fedorenko, 2017
- Pterostichus semiopacus Fedorenko, 2017
- Pterostichus sulcicollis Fedorenko, 2017

Subgenus Wraseiellus Shi & Sciaky, 2013

- Pterostichus andrewesi Jedlicka, 1931
- Pterostichus comatus Shi & Sciaky, 2013
- Pterostichus crassiapex Shi & Sciaky, 2013
- Pterostichus diversus (Fairmaire, 1886)
- Pterostichus kambaiti (Andrewes, 1947)
- Pterostichus meyeri Jedlicka, 1934
- Pterostichus pseudodiversus Shi & Sciaky, 2013
- Pterostichus stictopleurus (Fairmaire, 1889)

Unassigned Subgenus

- Pterostichus analis Jedlicka, 1963
- Pterostichus antepunctatus Straneo, 1949
- Pterostichus aristochroides Deuve, 2006
- Pterostichus chenpengi Li, 1992
- Pterostichus clepsydra Sciaky & Wrase, 1997
- Pterostichus deuvesianus Morvan, 1995
- Pterostichus georgi Straneo, 1963
- Pterostichus glabricollis Jedlicka, 1962
- Pterostichus gwervaenus Morvan, 1995
- Pterostichus heilongjiangensis Li, 1992
- Pterostichus imitatus Morvan, 1978
- Pterostichus jelepus Andrewes, 1932
- Pterostichus kiangsu Jedlicka, 1965
- Pterostichus kolosovi (Lutshnik, 1928)
- Pterostichus leviculus Andrewes, 1933
- Pterostichus lidarus (Andrewes, 1937)
- Pterostichus lukjanovitshi (Lutshnik, 1927)
- Pterostichus malaisei Jedlicka, 1965
- Pterostichus migliaccioi Straneo, 1982
- Pterostichus orobius Fairmaire, 1861
- Pterostichus peilingi Jedlicka, 1937
- Pterostichus punctisternus Straneo, 1989
- Pterostichus quadriimpressus Straneo, 1983
- Pterostichus reuteri Wrase & J.Schmidt, 2006
- Pterostichus rolex Morvan, 1995
- Pterostichus sintanus Andrewes, 1927
- Pterostichus styx (Andrewes, 1937)
- Pterostichus szekessyianus Sciaky, 1996
- Pterostichus tantillus (Fairmaire, 1889)
- Pterostichus tonkinensis Straneo, 1980
- Pterostichus zhejiangensis Kirschenhofer, 1997
- †Pterostichus abrogatus Scudder, 1890
- †Pterostichus depletus Scudder, 1900
- †Pterostichus destitutus Scudder, 1890
- †Pterostichus destructus Scudder, 1890
- †Pterostichus dormitans Scudder, 1890
- †Pterostichus fernquisti Wickham, 1931
- †Pterostichus fractus Scudder, 1890
- †Pterostichus laevigatus Scudder, 1890
- †Pterostichus minax (Oustalet, 1874)
- †Pterostichus minutulus Heer, 1862
- †Pterostichus provincialis (Oustalet, 1874)
- †Pterostichus pumpellyi Scudder, 1900
- †Pterostichus walcotti Scudder, 1900
