= Puffin Island (Alaska) =

Island in Northwest Arctic Borough, Alaska, United States

Puffin
Native name: Aġviat
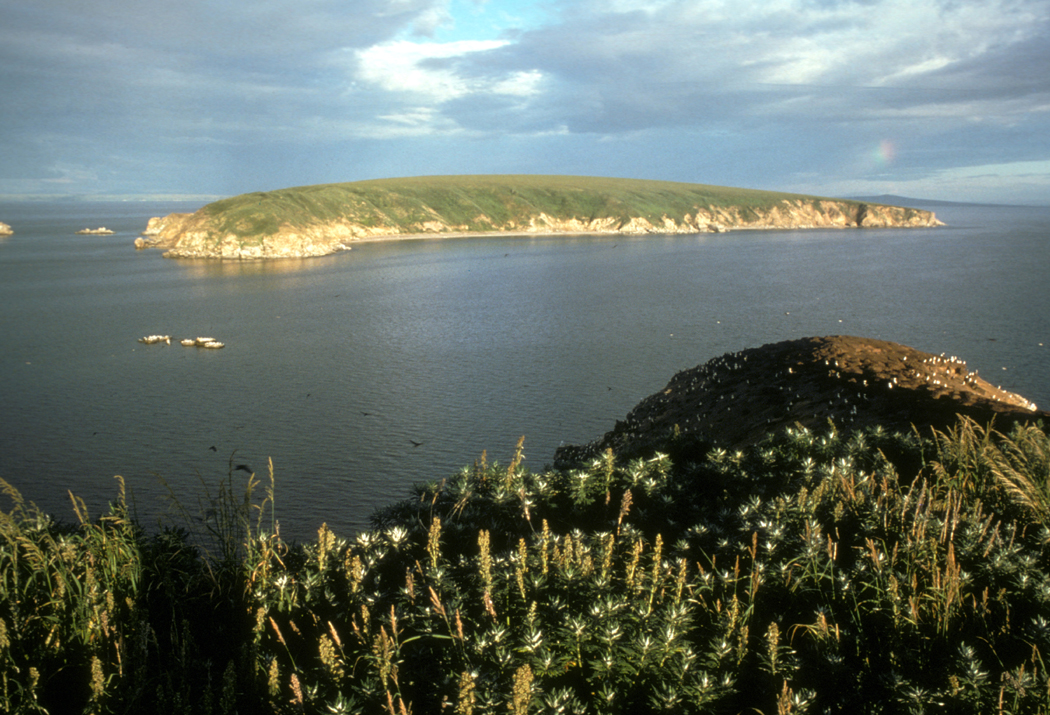
- Puffin Island in the foreground, looking to Chamisso Island
- Interactive map of Puffin

Geography
- Location: Arctic
- Coordinates: 66°13′40″N 161°51′31″W

Administration
- United States
- State: Alaska

Demographics
- Population: 0

Puffin Island (Iñupiaq: Aġviat) is a rocky islet in the Kotzebue Sound, Alaska. It is located off Spafarief Bay at the mouth of Eschscholtz Bay, just south of the Choris Peninsula, in the Northwest Arctic Borough at 66°13′40″N 161°51′31″W.

== Island ==
This island is located 415 m (454 yd) NW of Chamisso Island, 58 mi (93 km). SW of Selawik, Kotzebue-Kobuk Low. Puffin Island is a steep rock and, though much smaller than Chamisso Island, it has many more nesting birds on its surface, especially horned puffins, black-legged kittiwakes, and thick-billed murres which build their nests on the steep-walled cliffs that fall into Spafarief Bay. Iñupiat cross from the mainland to gather eggs, primarily from kittiwakes and murres. With the exception of birds and the occasional fox that crosses frozen sea in winter, nothing lives on the islands. Walruses, seals, and whales can often be seen in Spafarief Bay. Both islands are part of the Chamisso Wilderness in the Chukchi Sea unit of the Alaska Maritime National Wildlife Refuge.

This island was named in 1826 by Captain Frederick William Beechey (1831, p. 255), RN. He wrote, "Detached from Chamisso there is a steep rock which by way of distinction we named Puffin Island."

Puffin Island has been a Natural Reserve since December 7, 1912. The protected area (Chamisso Wilderness) includes Chamisso Island and Puffin Island, as well as some rocky islets nearby.

== See also ==
- List of islands of Alaska
