= Rurik expedition =

Russian circumnavigation of the globe in 1815-1818

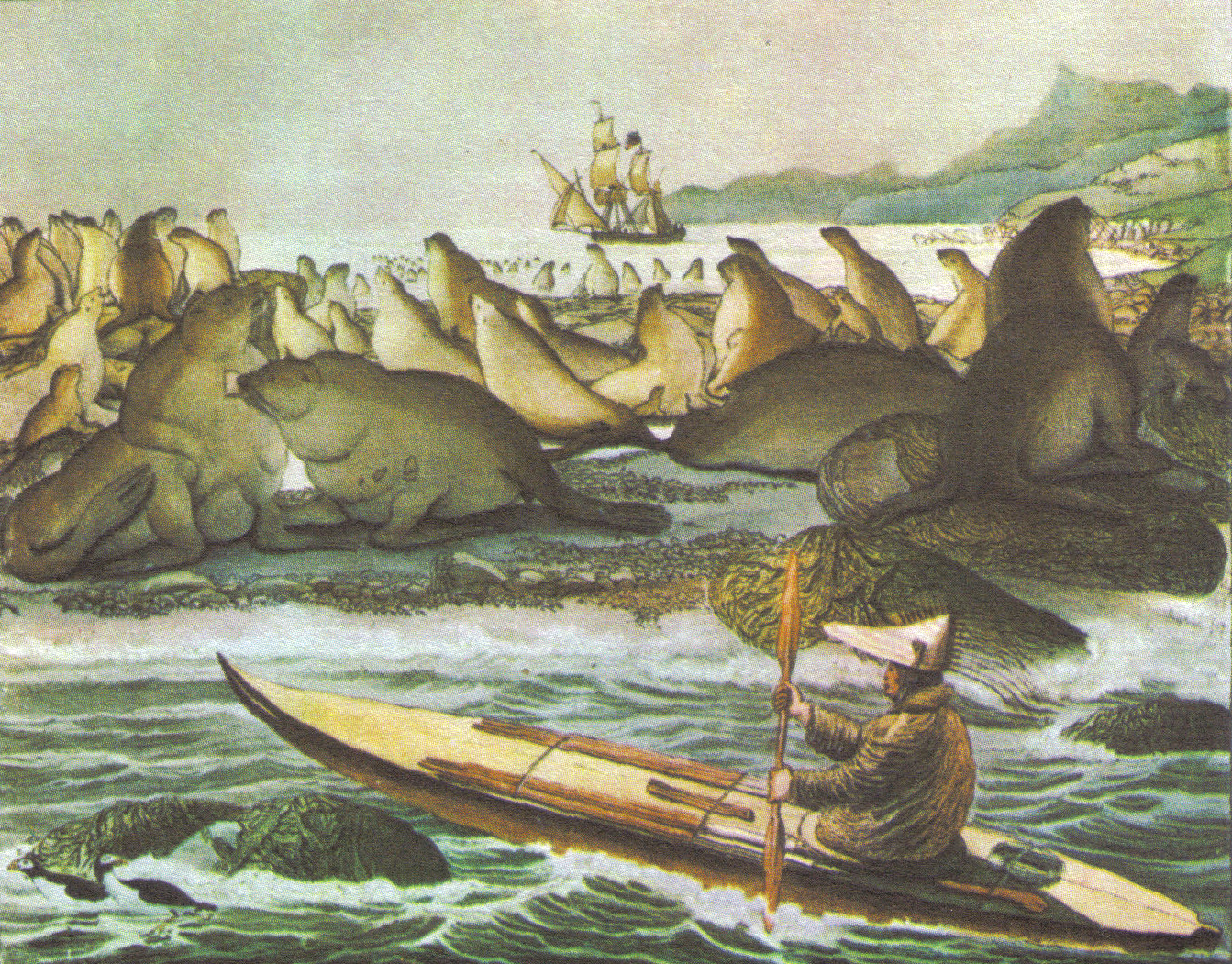
The Rurik is moored off the island of St. Paul to load provisions for the northern voyage (Drawing: Louis Choris)

The Russian Rurik Expedition ("Rurick Expedition") was a circumnavigation of the world that took place from July 30, 1815 to August 3, 1818 under the command of Otto von Kotzebue and was intended to discover and explore the Northwest Passage. The expedition of the warship Rurik (Russian Рюрик) was equipped and financed by the Russian Count Nikolai Petrovich Rumyantsev (Russian Никола́й Румянцев). It took place with the support of Tsar Alexander I. Due to adverse weather conditions, however, it did not reach its destination and returned earlier than planned. The historical significance of the expedition lies in the number of new discoveries along the entire route as well as the human and cultural experiences that the crew brought back from this three-year journey.

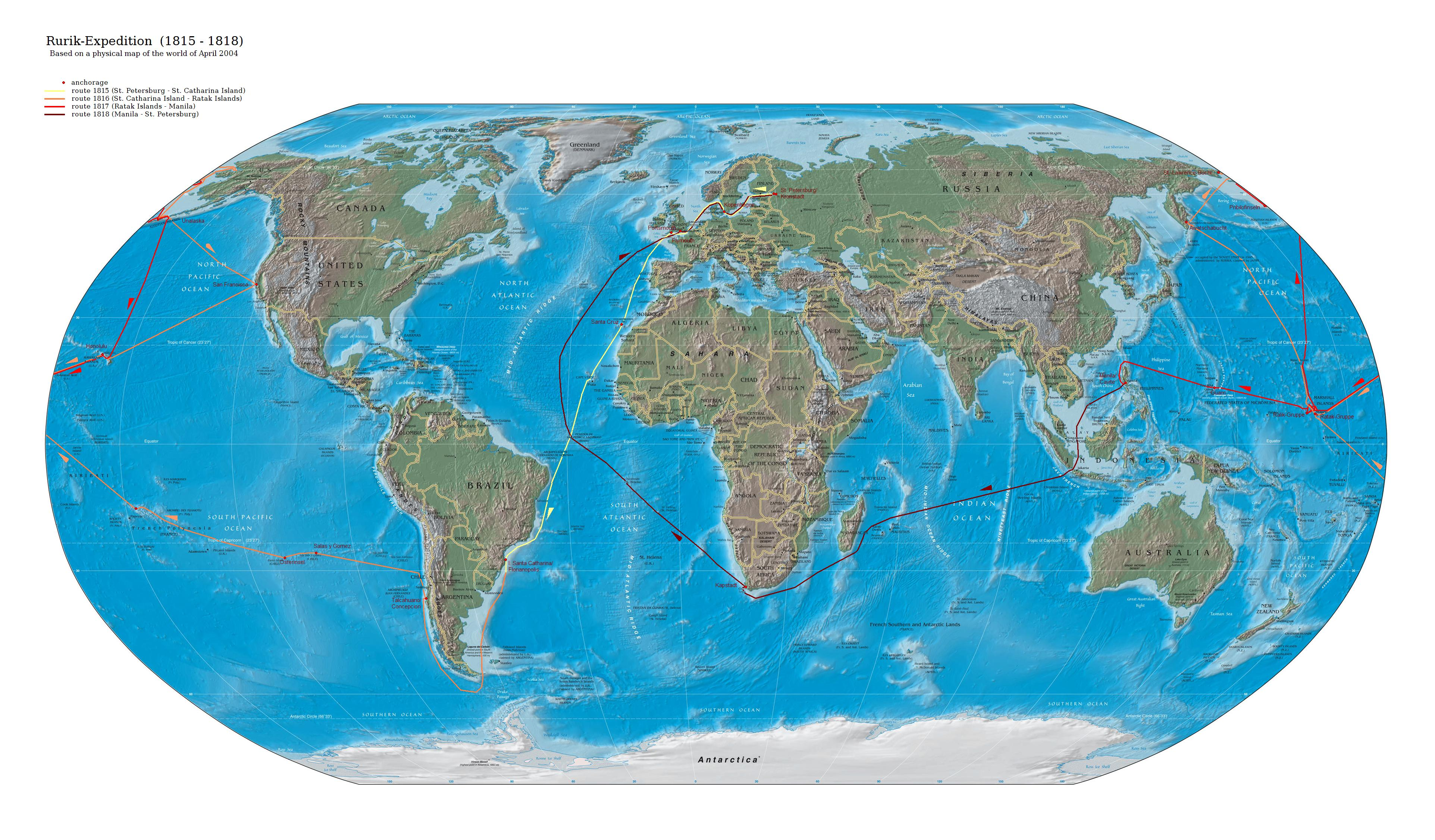
The expedition route (1815-1818)

== Aim of the expedition ==
The Russian desire to find the Northwest Passage was primarily for economic reasons. It was difficult and expensive to maintain supplies to the trading bases on the east coast of Russia and in the colony of Russian America, which stretched along the American west coast from Alaska to San Francisco, by land across the Asian continent. The search for a sea route to the north of the European and Asian continents (Northeast Passage) had not yet brought the desired success. The sea routes around the southern tip of Africa (Cape of Good Hope) or America (Cape Horn), on the other hand, proved to be time-consuming and dangerous due to a variety of threats, including adverse weather and piracy. Russia therefore hoped to discover a passage to the north of the American continent, which would have been much shorter and probably easier to navigate.

As all attempts to discover this sea route from the east had so far failed, this time the passage was to be found from the west and explored and sailed through in the opposite direction. It was hoped that the expedition's starting position could be improved by the fact that Russia had numerous trading bases on the west coast of the North American continent, which could serve as starting points for supplying the crew and providing other logistical support for the campaign.

The voyage included two summer campaigns (1816 and 1817): The first was intended to explore suitable anchorages north of the Bering Strait. With the second, they hoped to advance further north and east from there the following summer.

Like many before and after it, the expedition did not achieve its goal. However, Otto von Kotzebue was able to demonstrate a continuous ocean current, which was the first scientific proof of the existence of the Northwest Passage. In addition, von Kotzebue mapped over 400 islands in Polynesia and large parts of the west coast of Alaska. The naturalists documented a large number of unknown animal and plant species.

== Members of the expedition ==
In addition to the three coxswains Khramchenko, Petrov and Koniev, two non-commissioned officers, a cook and 20 sailors, the following people took part in the expedition:

- Otto von Kotzebue (1787–1846), lieutenant in the Imperial Russian Navy, captain of the Rurik and leader of the expedition.
- Johann Friedrich Eschscholtz (1793–1831), ship's doctor and naturalist
- Adelbert von Chamisso (1781–1838), naturalist (titular scholar), author of the diary Reise um die Welt in den Jahren 1815-1818
- Louis Choris (1795–1828), draughtsman (was also available to the naturalists for documentation purposes)
- Morten Wormskjold (1783–1845), volunteer naturalist (disembarked in Petropavlovsk-Kamchatsky)
- Gleb Semyonovich Shishmaryov, first lieutenant
- Ivan Yakovlevich Sakharin, second lieutenant
- Vasily Stepanovich Khromchenko, assistant coxswain

The following people were on board temporarily during the voyage:

- August 17, 1815: A pilot for the voyage in the Channel and to Plymouth.
- October 1, 1816: Two Russian sailors and one passenger: Elliot de Castro, personal physician to the King of Hawaii (from San Francisco to Hawaii)
- February 23, 1817: The South Sea islander Kadu (during the entire summer campaign of 1817)
- May 27, 1817: Two interpreters for the dialects of the more northern coastal peoples.
- August 1817: Four Aleuts to strengthen the crew

== The ship ==
The Rurik, named after the Varangian prince and founder of Russia Rurik (ca. 830 to ca. 879), was a small brig of 180 tons. For the duration of the expedition, it was authorized to fly the imperial Russian battle flag. It was therefore considered a warship. As the primary goal of the voyage was the discovery of the Northwest Passage, the ship was equipped only secondarily as a research vessel. The accompanying explorers therefore had to follow the military customs on board. Kotzebue's words to Adelbert von Chamisso, "that [he] as a passenger on a warship, where one was not accustomed to having any demands, had no right to make any." The explorers had little space available for collecting plants and artifacts. Most of the collections were immediately stowed away in sealed boxes below deck. As Adelbert von Chamisso describes, collections that were openly displayed were often thrown overboard (even on the captain's orders), as they interfered with the sailors' daily tasks on board.

The ship was only lightly armed and the eight cannons were used almost exclusively for firing salutes when entering and leaving foreign ports. Towards the end of the voyage, the Rurik encountered alleged pirate ships near the Sunda Strait, which were kept at a distance by firing warning shots.

Before the second summer campaign in 1817, the Rurik ran into a storm off Kamchatka and was badly damaged. The hastily carried out repair work in Unalaska was more of a damage limitation exercise than a complete restoration. The condition of the Rurik was officially regarded as one of the reasons why von Kotzebue did not want to continue north and abandoned the expedition's goal. During the return journey, the Rurik underwent a general overhaul at the shipyard in Cavite in the Philippines.

== Course of the expedition ==
=== From St. Petersburg to Kamchatka ===
The Rurik was to reach the Pacific via Cape Horn. This first major leg of the voyage, starting from St. Petersburg and Kronstadt, was already characterized by several shore excursions, from which the expedition's naturalists in particular were able to benefit. After a first short stay in Copenhagen, the journey continued to Plymouth on the south coast of England to prepare for the long Atlantic crossing. A stay of several days on Tenerife in the Canary Islands allowed the naturalists to explore a new world for the first time. Finally, on December 12, 1815, the Rurik reached the island of Ilha de Santa Catarina off the coast of Brazil and moored at Florianópolis.

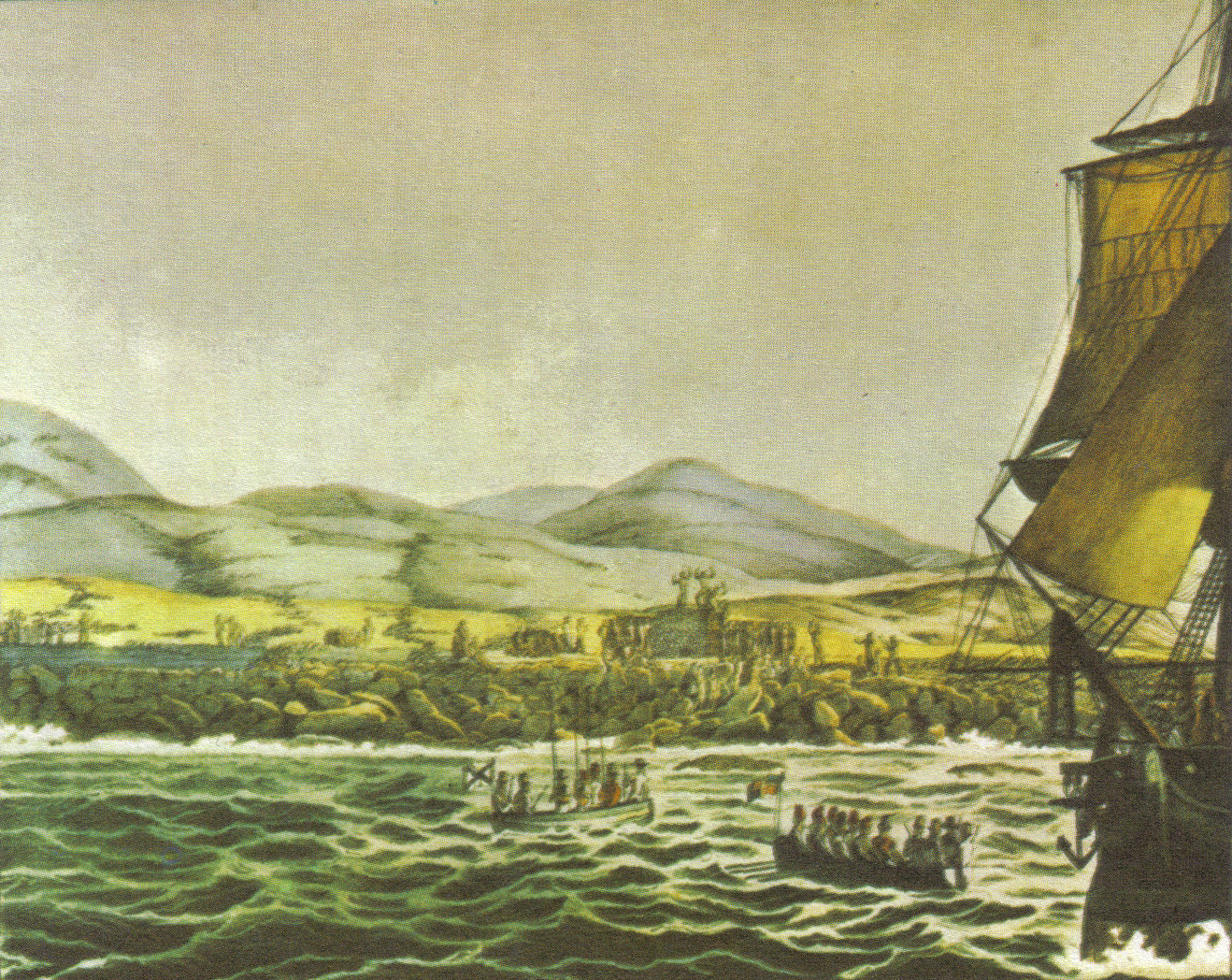
The Rurik anchors off Easter Island (Drawing: Louis Choris)

The rest of the voyage to the Russian peninsula of Kamchatka - around Cape Horn - was mainly characterized by a long stay in Talcahuano, Chile, during which lavish celebrations were held with the governor, the commander and the noblemen of the town and surrounding area. The subsequent voyage across the Pacific was carried out in haste in order to arrive in the Avacha Bay early enough to prepare for the summer campaign of 1816. The aim was to use the few warm days of the year to advance far enough north before the winter ice set in again.

Otto von Kotzebue chose a route far from the usual trade routes on his way to Awatscha. He mapped many islands in the Polynesian archipelago that had not yet been explored. However, the names given to these islands at the time have changed frequently to this day due to subsequent colonization by several other nations. On June 19, 1816, the Rurik docked in the Avacha Bay off Petropavlovsk-Kamchatsky.

=== Summer campaign 1816 ===
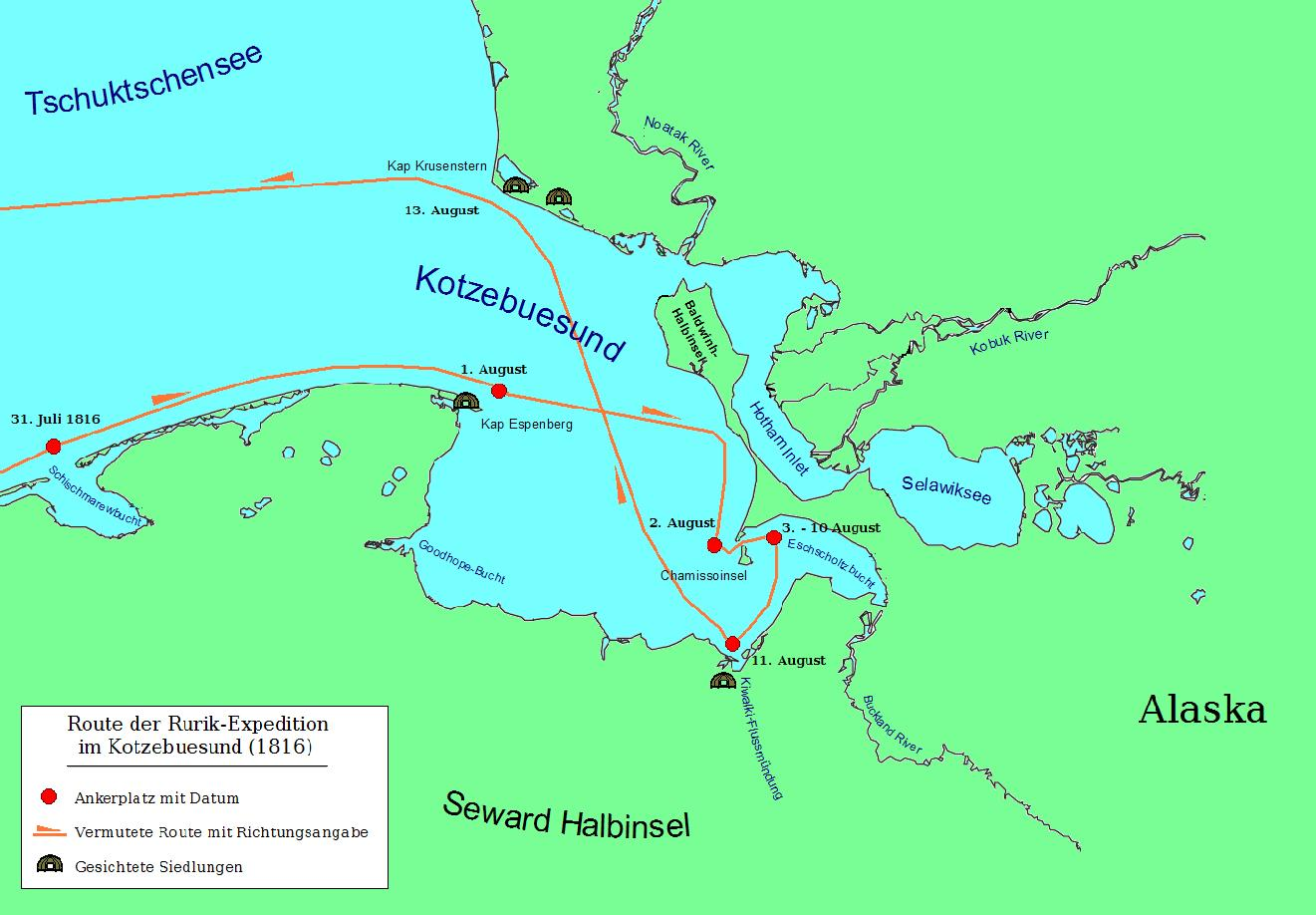
Route in Kotzebue Sound

The summer campaign of 1816 began on July 14 with the departure from Avacha Bay on the Kamchatka Peninsula and ended with the arrival in the harbor of Unalaska, an island in the Aleutian Islands, on September 7. Its purpose was to explore the sea and the coasts north of the Bering Strait and to find suitable anchorages in preparation for a further advance during the summer campaign of 1817. During this voyage, Kotzebue Sound with Eschscholtz Bay and Chamisso Island and other landmarks were discovered (see map on the right). Contact was also established and maintained with the locals living there. After an initial cautious approach, it was often possible to trade: In exchange for needles, scissors, knives and, above all, tobacco, the expedition members were able to obtain provisions, clothing and cultural items in the form of everyday objects, works of art or cult objects.

The Rurik sailed on from Avacha Bay on a north-easterly course until it reached St. Lawrence Island and then crossed the Bering Strait along the Alaskan coast. Here the captain first followed a sandbank-like chain of islands lying just off the coast until Shishmarev Bay was reached. After a brief exploration of the bay, the journey continued to Cape Espenberg at the northern entrance to Kotzebue Sound. Hoping to have found the entrance to the Northwest Passage there, the course was changed to the east on August 2. However, the Rurik soon encountered the Baldwin Peninsula and followed the coastline southwards until the entrance to Eschscholtz Bay opened up, into which the ship sailed between the Baldwin Peninsula and Chamisso Island. In the days that followed, the captain had the bay explored with rowing boats, but had to realize that there was no way forward. On August 7, Eschscholtz discovered icebergs in the south of the bay.

On August 11, the expedition resumed its journey and followed the southern coast of Kotzebue Sound to the mouth of the Kiwalik River. There, von Kotzebue asked an Eskimo about the further course of the river. He suspected a direct connection to southern Norton Sound across the Seward Peninsula. As this assumption could not be confirmed, the expedition was resumed in a northerly direction until it reached Cape Krusenstern in the north of the entrance to the sound. Because summer had now advanced, the captain decided to cross the Chukchi Sea in a westerly direction and pass the Bering Strait southwards along the Russian coast.

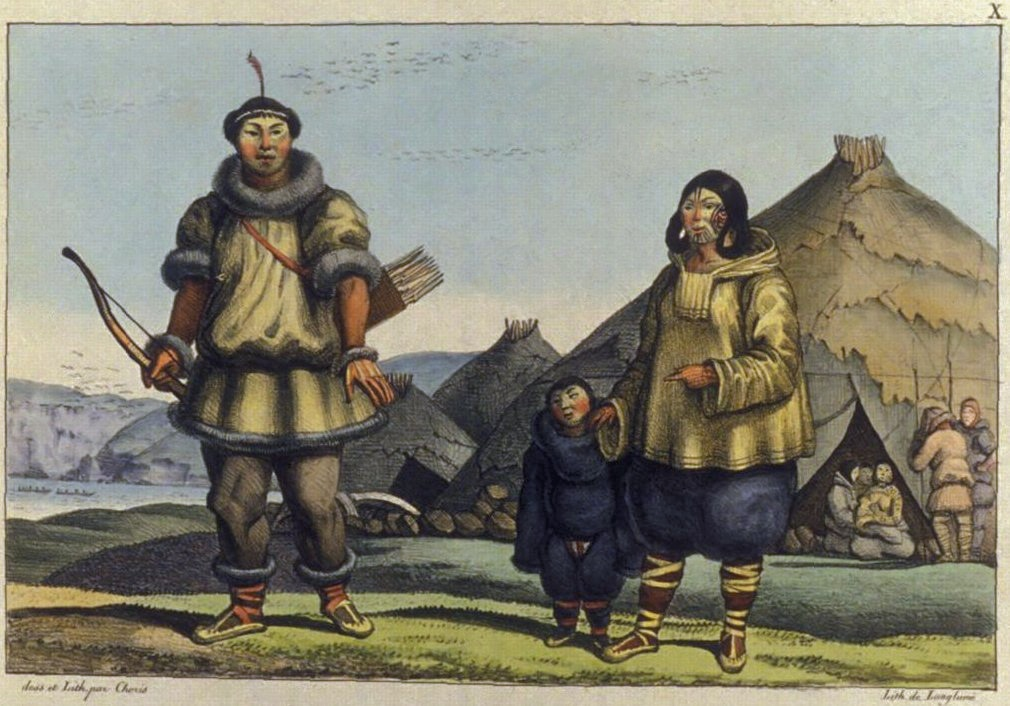
A Chukchi family near the Bering strait (Illustration: Louis Choris)

The Rurik sailed south of the strait into the St. Lawrence Bay (Russian: zaliv Lavrentija) and anchored there. The captain traded fresh reindeer meat with the Chukchi people living there. During the stay, many Chukchi from southern Mechigmensky Bay (Russian: Mečigmeskij zaliv) came to St. Lawrence Bay to marvel at the new arrivals. Due to bad weather, the captain did not set course for the eastern tip of St. Lawrence Island until August 29. Due to persistent dense fog, the Rurik ran at a respectful distance along the island to the east, did not dare to anchor and finally set course to the south. On September 3, the island of Saint Paul in the Pribilof Islands came into view. The Rurik sailed on here as well and entered the port of Unalaska on September 7.

In Unalaska, the agent of the "Russian-American Company" (a Russian trading company) was tasked with preparing the following year's summer campaign, while the Rurik was to spend the winter in more southerly latitudes. In addition, 16 Aleuts (including a translator) had to be ready to travel north the following year.

=== From Unalaska across the East Pacific ===
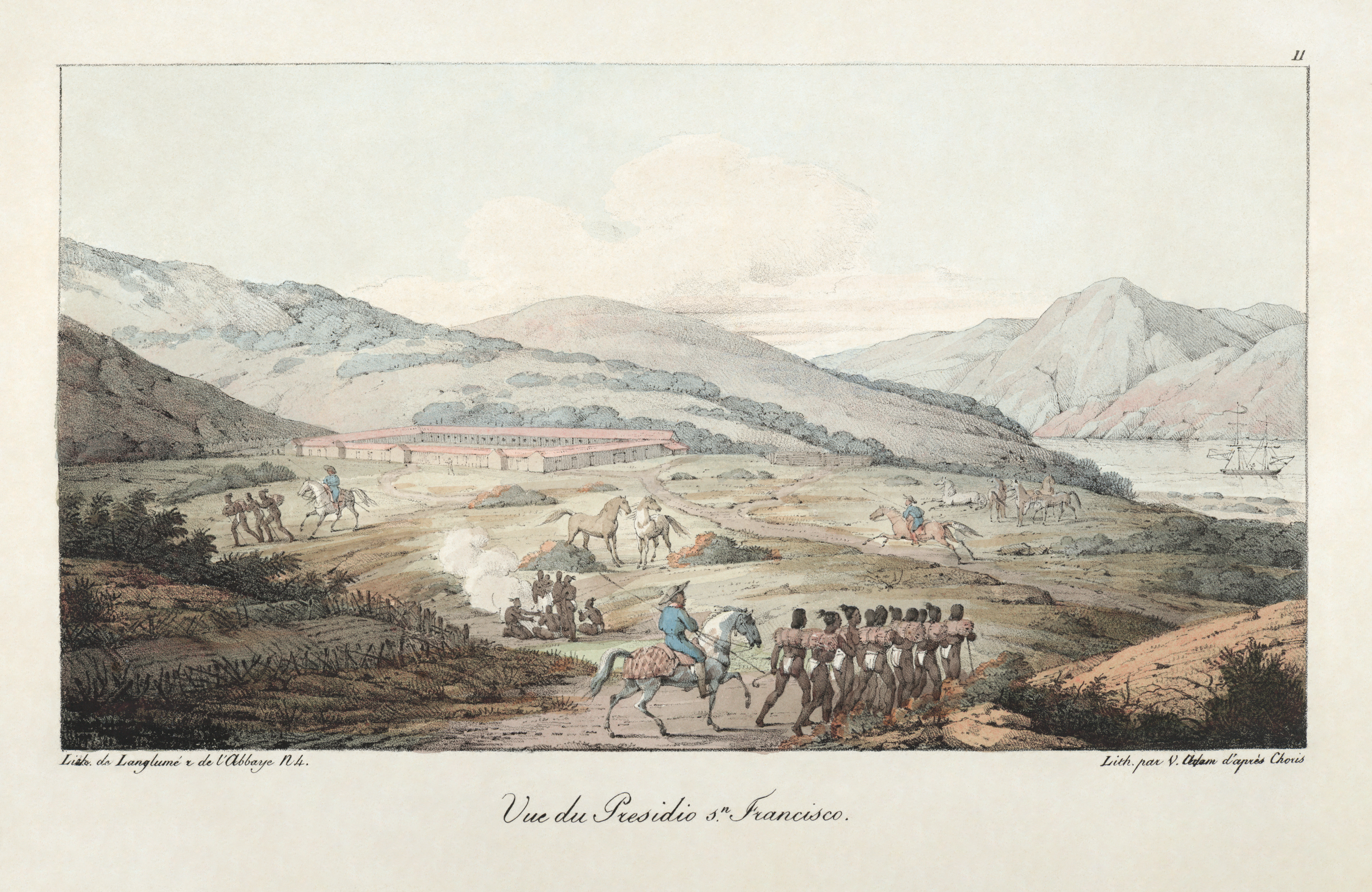
The Presidio of San Francisco (Illustration: Louis Choris)

To avoid the harsh winter in the north and give the crew some rest before the planned summer campaign in 1817, the Rurik headed south to warmer regions. This voyage took them from Unalaska to San Francisco in Spanish California and on to Hawaii and the Marshall Islands.

In San Francisco and Hawaii, the crew had to take on diplomatic tasks that went far beyond the scope of their scientific mission. First of all, a dispute between the Spanish governor of the region, Don Paolo Vicente de Sola, and the Russian Empire - represented by Otto von Kotzebue in his capacity as a lieutenant in the Imperial Russian Navy - concerning the actions of the Russian-American Trading Company on the Californian coast was provisionally settled in negotiations in the Presidio of San Francisco: Disagreements had arisen under international law with Russian colonists who had established a fur trade settlement and fort a little further north on Bodega Bay without permission from the Spanish. Von Kotzebue succeeded in postponing a possible armed conflict by persuading both parties to make their further actions dependent on the attitude of their respective governments. However, there was no official reaction from the governments concerned and so the status quo remained for some time.

Hawaii had also recently been the victim of a political dispute with forces of the Russian-American Trading Company. Two of their merchant ships had hoisted the Russian flag on one of the islands in an attempt to take possession of it for the Tsar. Bloodshed was avoided in time thanks to the mediation of some Europeans and Americans living there, but in response to their expulsion, the Russian sailors threatened to wage war on the islands. In this situation, the Rurik reached Hawaii and found itself confronted by a large number of armed and combat-ready islanders. Fortunately, the Rurik had taken on board Elliot de Castro, the personal physician of the King of Hawaii, in San Francisco. He was able to mediate before war broke out. As a guest of King Kamehameha I, Otto von Kotzebue was subsequently able to convince him of his and the Russian Empire's peaceful attitude.

The expedition then visited numerous island kingdoms in the island world of the Marshall Islands. The Ratak chain was mainly mapped and attempts were made to introduce the locals, who had to live off the rather meagre resources of the islands, to new sources of food by growing fruit and vegetables. However, these attempts almost completely failed, as rats devastated many of the allotments and the islanders had difficulty accepting farm animals. Nevertheless, relations between the representatives of the two cultures were as open as they were friendly and allowed for lively bartering and the giving of gifts. On departure, a Rataker named Kadu joined the expedition and both naturalist and captain took the opportunity to learn more about the language, culture and geography of this island community.

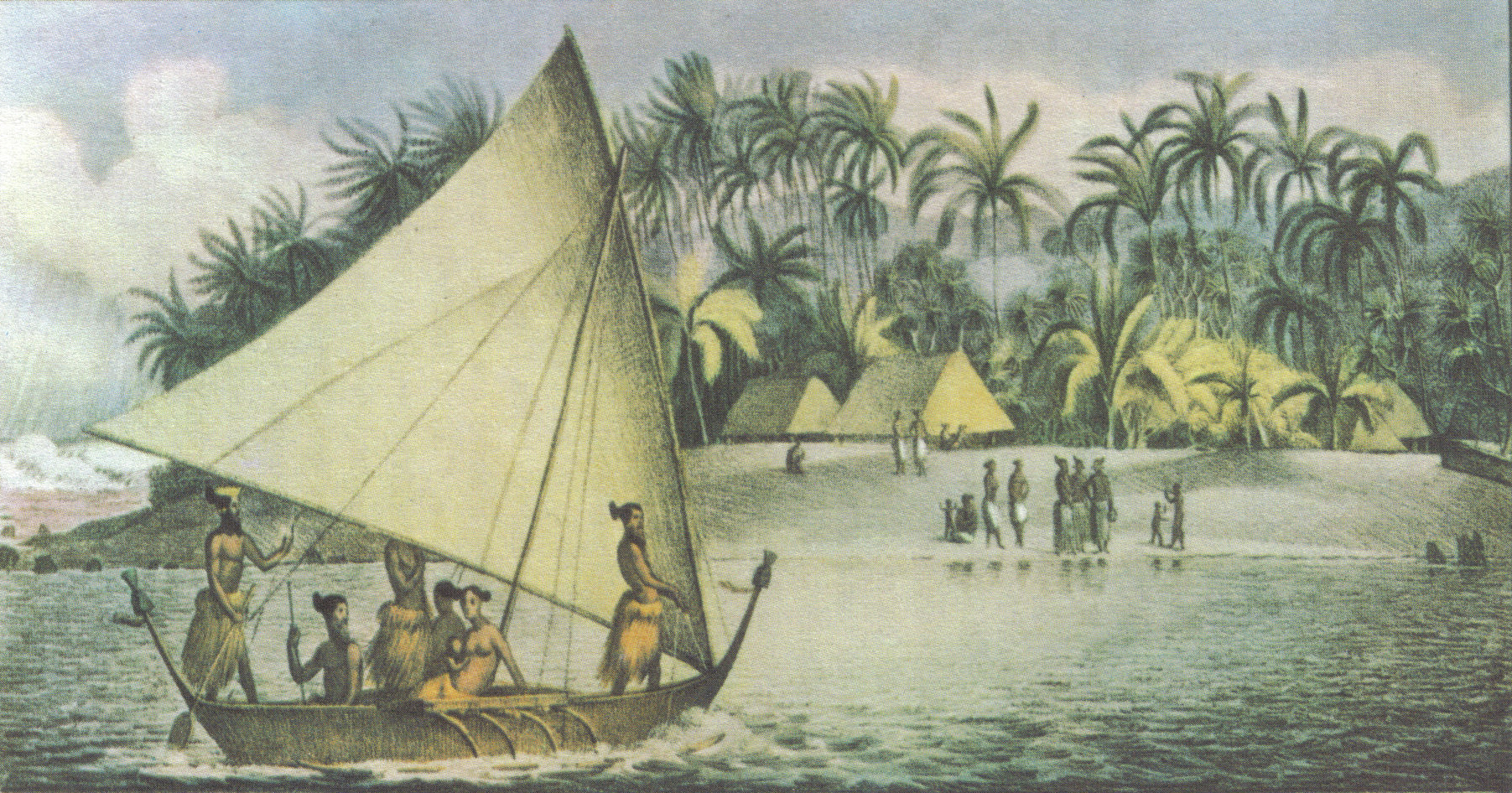
The Krusenstern Islands (today Tikehau). The Ratak chain was visited by the Rurik three times (Illustration: Louis Choris)

On the journey back north, the Rurik was caught in a heavy storm that severely damaged the ship. The expedition made it to the safe harbor of Unalaska with great difficulty. Three sailors had been seriously injured in the storm and the captain's health had also suffered. There was not much time to get the ship ready for sea again, as summer was already setting in and so the Rurik was only provisionally repaired and quickly equipped for the second summer campaign.

=== Summer campaign of 1817 ===
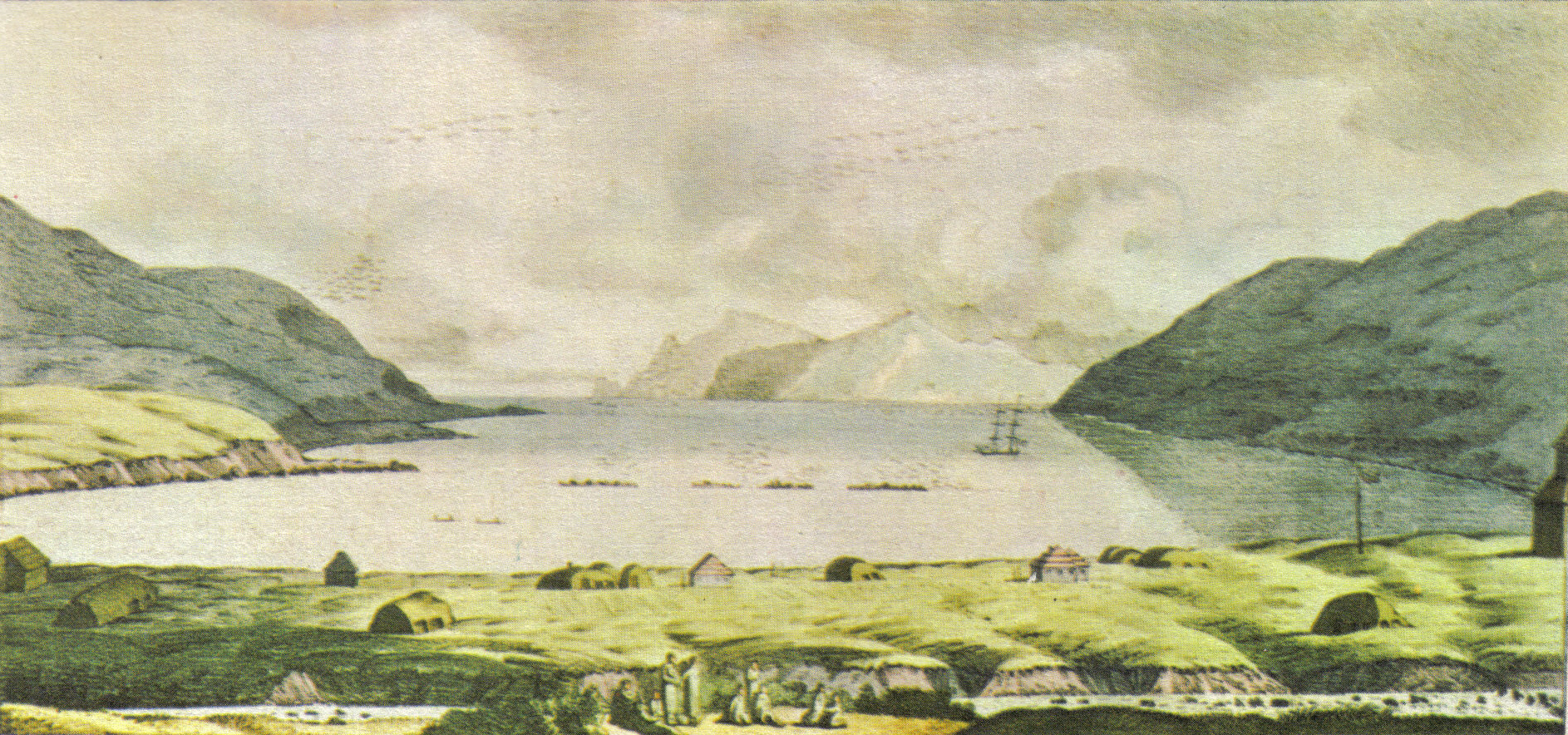
The port of Unalaska served the Rurik as a supply station three times (Illustration: Louis Choris)

The expectations placed on the expedition could not be fulfilled. Starting from the coasts and anchorages explored in the summer of 1816, the expedition was to find the Northwest Passage. Fifteen Aleuts were taken on board for this purpose, as well as a number of small boats. If it proved impossible to continue the journey on the Rurik, the plan was to leave it at a safe anchorage and continue the journey on the small boats with the help of the Aleuts. However, after the crew had stocked up on food and equipment on Unalaska and the Pribilof Islands, the prospects were bad: the winter had lasted a long time this year, the ice melt was late and the captain's health was also beginning to deteriorate due to the low temperatures and wet weather.

When the eastern tip of St. Lawrence Island was reached on July 10, the captain learned from the Chukchi that the ice in the north had only been broken up for a few days and was slowly drifting north with the current. That same day, the captain raised the anchors and sailed around the island. However, ice was sighted in the evening. The captain was suffering from severe chest pains and was bedridden. The ship's doctor assured the captain that he would be risking his life if he continued north. The condition of the ship was also not ideal for defying the harsh conditions of the north.

Under these circumstances, the captain decided on July 12 to abandon the expedition's destination and sail home via Unalaska, Hawaii, the Marshall Islands and Manila. This decision was later heavily criticized. It was unusual at the time, especially on a warship, to make the course of a voyage dependent on the health of the captain when there were other officers (such as Lieutenant Shishmarev) on board who could have taken command. It was also speculated that the northward drifting pack ice would have opened up after the Rurik had evaded Kamchatka or St. Lawrence Bay. However, the captain's written order stood firm and the return journey to Unalaska was begun.

The Rurik turned back and crossed the Bering Sea heading for Unalaska without seeing St. Matthew Island and the Pribilof Islands due to foggy weather. On July 22, the Rurik entered the port of Unalaska again.

=== Return journey across Manila ===
During a short stay on Unalaska, the expedition equipment for the north and most of the additional Alëuten were disembarked. The Rurik then sailed to Hawaii, where the explorers met the king again. From there, the journey continued to the Marshall Islands. However, the reception there was not exuberant, as most of the men had gone to war against a neighboring island kingdom. The Rataker Kadu also disembarked here. In view of the unstable situation, the Rurik remained only briefly off these islands. In a hurry, an attempt was made to plant some gardens and accommodate livestock. Kadu was to oversee the maintenance of these new food sources.

The Rurik then sailed to Manila, where the ship, which had suffered damage during the northern voyages, was repaired in the shipyard at Cavite. After a long stay, the ship continued through the Sunda Strait into the Indian Ocean, which was crossed to the Cape of Good Hope at the southern tip of Africa. There, the Rurik anchored for a short time in Cape Town. The expedition then continued its journey along the islands of the South Atlantic and returned to Portsmouth in England via the Canary Islands. The last leg of the journey was a direct route to Kronstadt Fortress and on to St. Petersburg.

== Research work ==
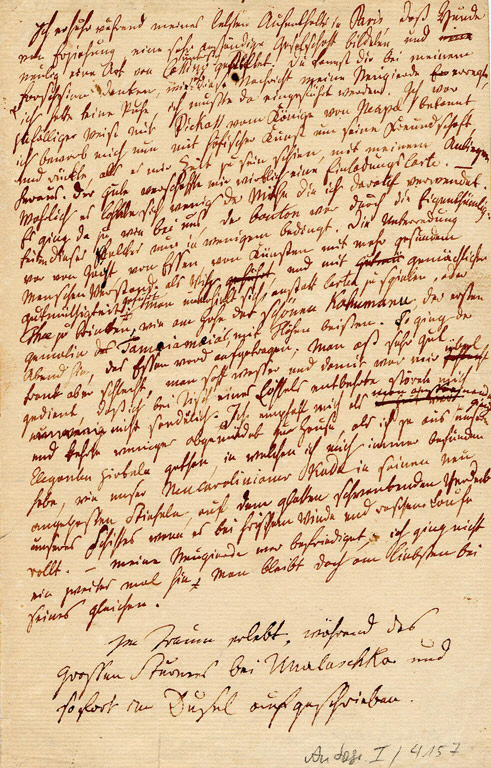
Chamisso: During the stormy nights on he Rurik, April 1817

Adelbert von Chamisso had to realize regretfully at the beginning of the voyage that his role as titular scholar on the Rurik was only of secondary importance. However, it was only at the beginning of the summer campaign in 1816 that he began to suspect the reasons for this, when he learned that the main, indeed almost exclusive, aim of the expedition was to explore the Northwest Passage and that all his research was merely a decorative accessory to satisfy the spirit of the times, which demanded that such expeditions be accompanied by scholars. Ultimately, however, it was a matter of "high politics", namely that Russia was already aware at the time that it would only be able to keep the colonies on the American mainland in the long term if it could open up a viable sea route in the North Sea to supply them and enter into stable trade relations with them. As the tsar considered the likelihood of success to be low, it was left to Count Rumyantsev to finance the campaign.

However, this did not diminish Chamisso's curiosity. From the very beginning, he collected everything that he thought might be of importance for any branch of science at the time: plants, animals, minerals, bones and handicraft products of the peoples he visited. His passion for collecting did not even restrain him from human skulls. Wherever he could, he tried to catalog and describe what he found, and studied the languages, customs and traditions of the people he encountered. He had a great love for the peoples of Polynesia and Micronesia. More than once he had to experience that parts of his collection were destroyed or mutilated by the sailors of his own ship, sometimes willfully, sometimes out of ignorance. But he continued undaunted, and in the end he managed to bring home a considerable collection of evidence of a world that was still foreign to Europe at the time.

As the sponsor of the journey, Count Rumyantsev, did not insist on any title to the artifacts he had brought with him, von Chamisso was able to ship them to Berlin at the end of the journey. He donated most of the natural and cultural artefacts he had collected to the Botanical Garden in Berlin, where he found a position as second curator. In addition to a volume of the official expedition report, he published his travel diary Reise um die Welt in den Jahren 1815-1818 in 1836 and his language study Über die Hawaiische Sprache in 1837.

== After the expedition ==
The Rurik was sold after arriving in St. Petersburg. Otto von Kotzebue wrote a detailed expedition report, which was supplemented by the reports of the individual expedition members.

After his appointment as captain, von Kotzebue undertook another voyage around the world on the Predprijatije from 1823 to 1826, on which he was accompanied by Johann Friedrich Eschscholtz. They also visited the island chains that they had discovered with the Rurik. They discovered that the attempts to spread new food and livestock on the islands had largely failed.

The Northwest Passage lost importance for Russia. After the various search expeditions for the missing British explorer John Franklin around the middle of the 19th century had proven the insignificance of the Northwest Passage for shipping, the fur trade on the American west coast began to decline at the same time. As a result of the abandonment of the settlements in North America, Alaska was finally sold in 1867. The Northeast Passage, which was opened up by Adolf Erik Nordenskiöld in 1879, and the construction of the Trans-Siberian Railway (1891–1916) served to supply the Russian settlements on the Pacific directly.

== Bibliography ==
=== Sources ===
- von Chamisso, Adelbert (1836). Reise um die Welt. Vol. 1 Diary. Leipzig.
- von Chamisso, Adelbert (1836). Reise um die Welt. Vol. 2: Appendix. Remarks and views. Leipzig.
- von Chamisso, Adelbert (2012). Reise um die Welt. Berlin: Die Andere Bibliothek. ISBN 9783847700104.

=== Representations ===
- Choris, Louis (1822). Voyage pittoresque autour du monde. Paris.
- Henze, Dietmar (2001). "Kotzebue, Otto von". Enzyklopädie der Entdecker und Erforscher der Erde. Vol. 3, 5. Darmstadt: Wissenschaftliche Buchgesellschaft.
- von Kotzebue, Otto (2004). Zu Eisbergen und Palmenstränden 1815–1818. Mit der Rurik um die Welt. Ed. Erdmann. ISBN 386503005X.
- Langner, Beatrix (2008). Der wilde Europäer – Adelbert von Chamisso. Vol. [Part III: Die Reise um die Welt]. Berlin: Matthes und Seitz.
- Mahr, August Karl (1932). The Visit of the Rurik to San Francisco in 1816. Stanford, California: The Geographical Journal.
- Mornin, Edward (2002). Through alien eyes: the visit of the Russian ship Rurik to San Francisco in 1816 and the men behind the visit. Bern: P. Lang. ISBN 3906769593.
