= Hymenoplia =

Scientific classification
- Kingdom: Animalia
- Phylum: Arthropoda
- Clade: Pancrustacea
- Class: Insecta
- Order: Coleoptera
- Suborder: Polyphaga
- Infraorder: Scarabaeiformia
- Family: Scarabaeidae
- Subfamily: Sericinae
- Tribe: Sericini
- Genus: Hymenoplia; Eschscholtz, 1830

Synonyms
- Demophila Gistel, 1834

Genus of leaf beetles

Hymenoplia is a genus of beetles belonging to the family Scarabaeidae.

== Species ==
- Hymenoplia algirica Reitter, 1890
- Hymenoplia antoinei Kocher, 1952
- Hymenoplia arragonica Escalera, 1927
- Hymenoplia atlantea Baraud, 1985
- Hymenoplia atlasica Escalera, 1914
- Hymenoplia azrouensis Escalera, 1934
- Hymenoplia castiliana Reitter, 1890
- Hymenoplia castilianissima Báguena, 1954
- Hymenoplia chevrolati Mulsant, 1842
- Hymenoplia cinerascens Rosenhauer, 1856
- Hymenoplia clypealis Reitter, 1902
- Hymenoplia escalerai Báguena, 1954
- Hymenoplia fulvescens Escalera, 1934
- Hymenoplia fulvipennis Blanchard, 1850
- Hymenoplia galaica Báguena, 1954
- Hymenoplia heydeni Desbrochers des Loges, 1884
- Hymenoplia hirsutissima Báguena, 1956
- Hymenoplia illigeri Perez Arcas, 1874
- Hymenoplia jayenensis Báguena, 1954
- Hymenoplia ketamensis Escalera, 1934
- Hymenoplia lata Heyden, 1870
- Hymenoplia lecerfi Escalera, 1934
- Hymenoplia lineolata Blanchard, 1850
- Hymenoplia lucusensis Escalera, 1934
- Hymenoplia mairei Escalera, 1934
- Hymenoplia meknesensis Escalera, 1934
- Hymenoplia miegii Graëlls, 1858
- Hymenoplia minuta Báguena, 1955
- Hymenoplia oudjdensis Escalera, 1934
- Hymenoplia pardoalcaidei López-Colón & Bahillo de la Puebla, 2014
- Hymenoplia pilosissima Báguena, 1956
- Hymenoplia pseudocinerascens Báguena, 1954
- Hymenoplia riffensis Escalera, 1925
- Hymenoplia roulleaui Báguena, 1956
- Hymenoplia rufinoides Báguena, 1956
- Hymenoplia rugosa Báguena, 1956
- Hymenoplia rugulosa Mulsant, 1842
- Hymenoplia sefroensis Báguena, 1956
- Hymenoplia sericea Escalera, 1925
- Hymenoplia sicula Blanchard, 1850
- Hymenoplia strigosa (Illiger, 1803)
- Hymenoplia subcinerascens Escalera, 1925
- Hymenoplia theryi Escalera, 1934
- Hymenoplia ungulata Peyerimhoff, 1945
- Hymenoplia vulpecula Reitter, 1890
- Hymenoplia zibana Peyerimhoff, 1945
