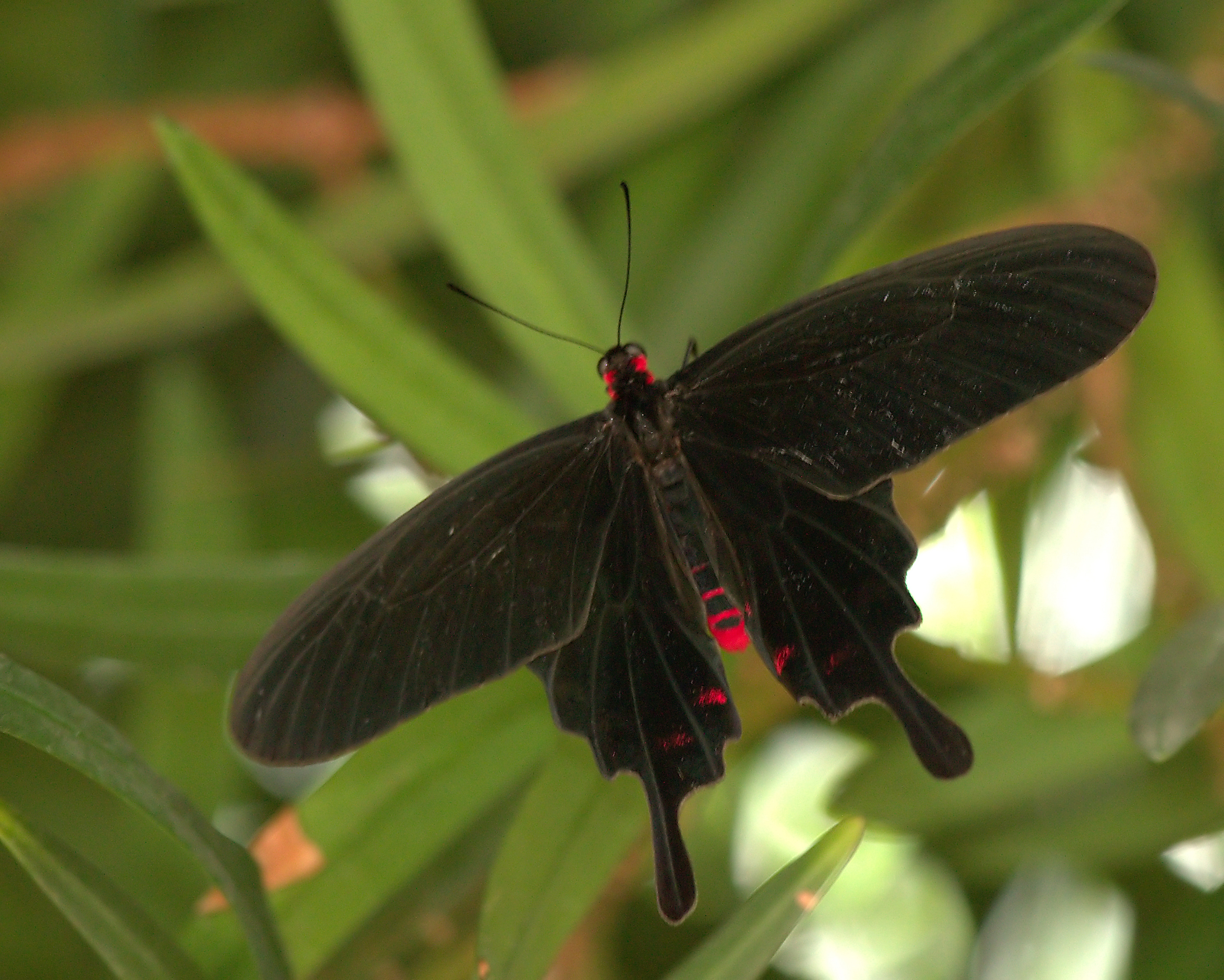

Scientific classification
- Kingdom: Animalia
- Phylum: Arthropoda
- Class: Insecta
- Order: Lepidoptera
- Family: Papilionidae
- Genus: Pachliopta
- Species: P. kotzebuea

Binomial name
- Pachliopta kotzebuea (Eschscholtz, 1821)

Synonyms
- Papilio kotzebuea Escholtz, 1821; Atrophaneura kotzebuea; Pachliopta aristolochiae kotzebuea Escholtz, 1821

= Pachliopta kotzebuea =

Pink rose

Species of butterfly

Pachliopta kotzebuea, the pink rose, is a butterfly of the family Papilionidae (the swallowtails). It is found in the Philippines.

Food plants include birthwort (Aristolochia) species.

== Etymology ==
The species was named for Otto von Kotzebue, commander of the Russian expeditionary ship Rurik. Johann Friedrich von Eschscholtz served as physician and naturalist aboard the Rurik on a circumnavigational voyage from 1815 to 1818.

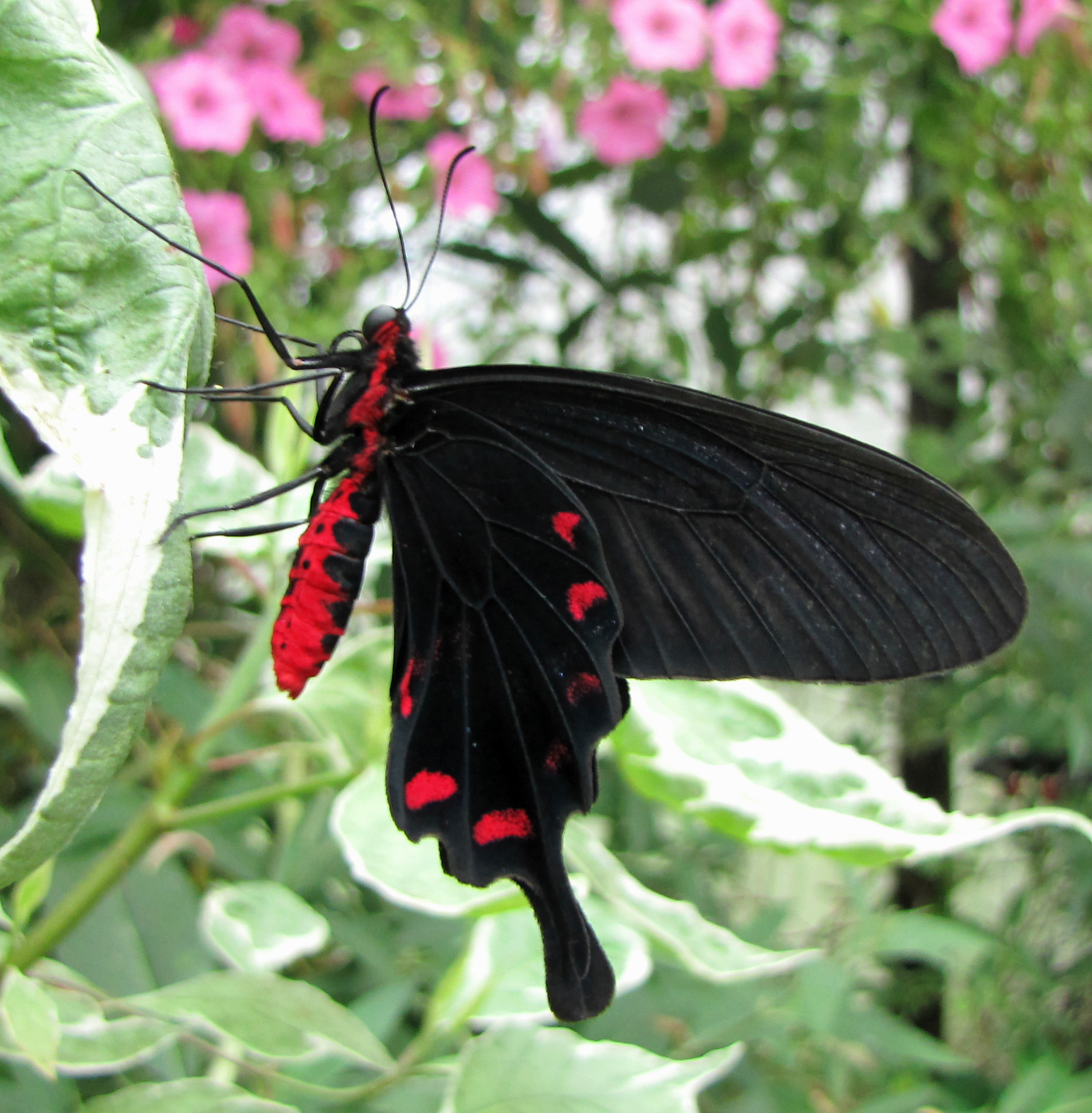
Underside

== Subspecies ==
- P. k. bilara (Page & Treadaway, 1995) (Philippines (Bohol, Cebu))
- P. k. deseilus (Fruhstorfer, 1911) (Philippines (Mindoro, Marinduque, Masbate, Ticao, Panay, Negros, Sibuyan Islands))
- P. k. kotzebuea (Philippines (western and central Luzon))
- P. k. mataconga (Page & Treadaway, 1995) (Philippines (southern Luzon))
- P. k. philippus (Semper, 1891) (Philippines (Samar, Leyte, Dinagar, Mindanao, Panaon, Camiguin de Mindanao, Siargao, Homonhon, Sarangani))
- P. k. tindongana (Page & Treadaway, 1995) (Philippines (north-eastern Luzon, Babuyanes))
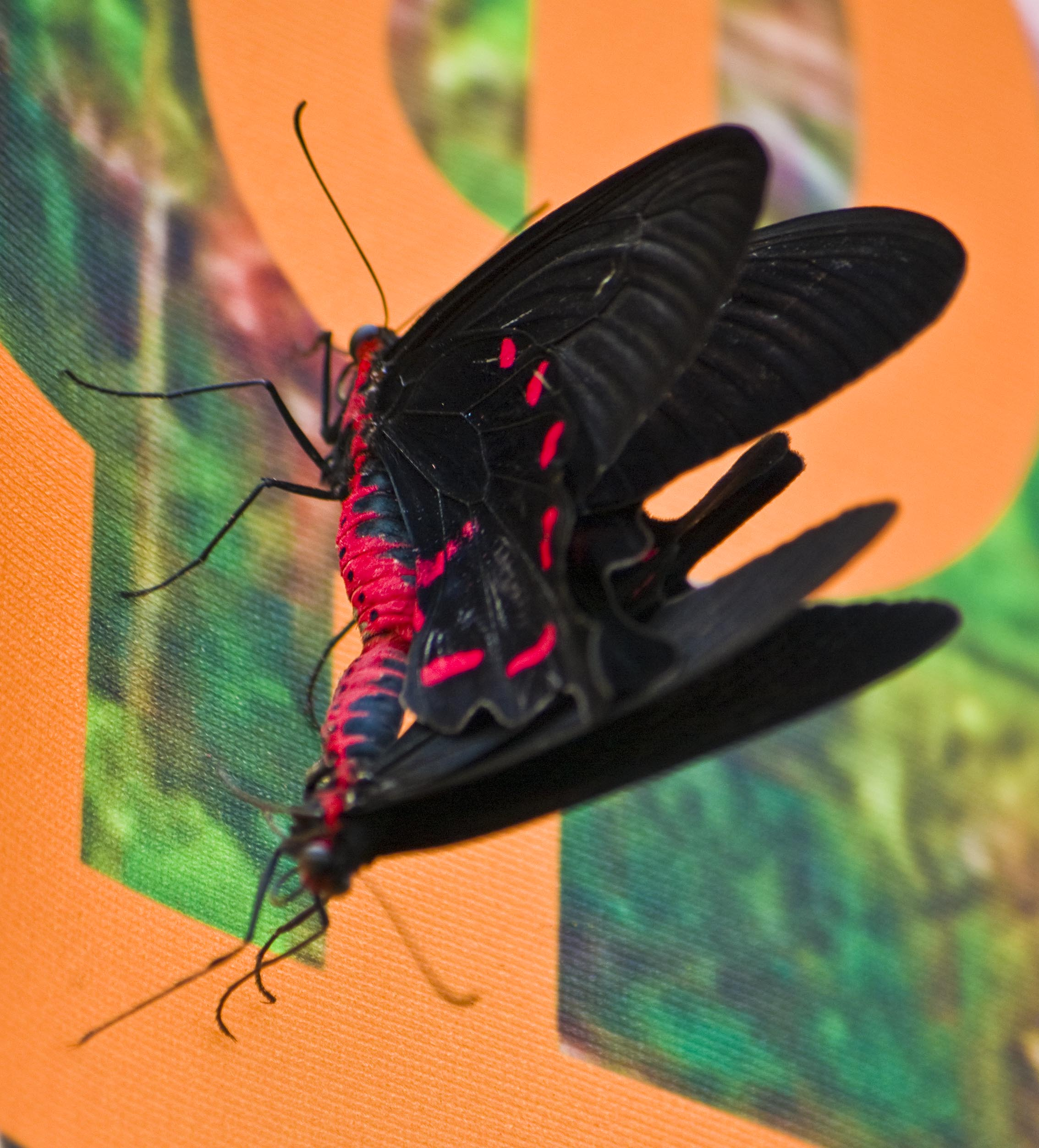
Mating pair
