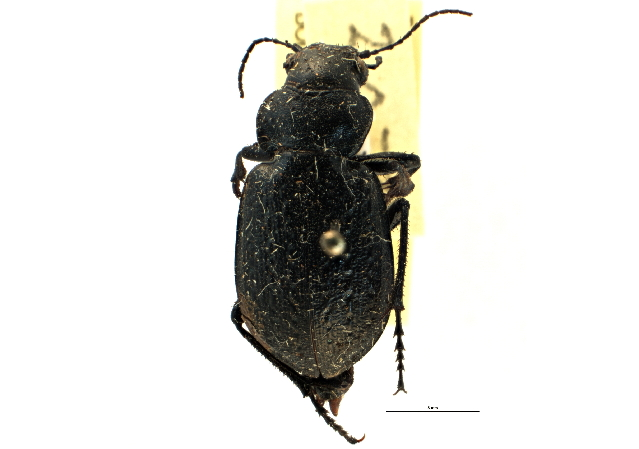

Scientific classification
- Domain: Eukaryota
- Kingdom: Animalia
- Phylum: Arthropoda
- Class: Insecta
- Order: Coleoptera
- Suborder: Adephaga
- Family: Carabidae
- Genus: Calosoma
- Species: C. cancellatum

Binomial name
- Calosoma cancellatum Eschscholtz, 1833

Synonyms
- Callisthenes cancellatus; Calosoma aenescens LeConte, 1854; Calosoma esuriens Casey, 1913; Calosoma praestans Casey, 1920; Calosoma rectilaterum Casey, 1920; Calosoma sagax Casey, 1920; Calosoma transversum Casey, 1913

= Calosoma cancellatum =

Species of beetle

Calosoma cancellatum, the latticed beautiful black searcher, is a species of ground beetle in the subfamily of Carabinae. It was described by Eschscholtz in 1833. This species is found in British Columbia, Arizona, California, Idaho, Montana, Nevada, Oregon, Utah and Washington. Its habitat consists of open dry ground, and may also be found in cultivated fields.

Adults are diurnal and they prey on lepidopterous caterpillars, but also on elaterids, flies and orthopterans. Larvae have been recorded feeding on the larvae of Peridroma saucia.
