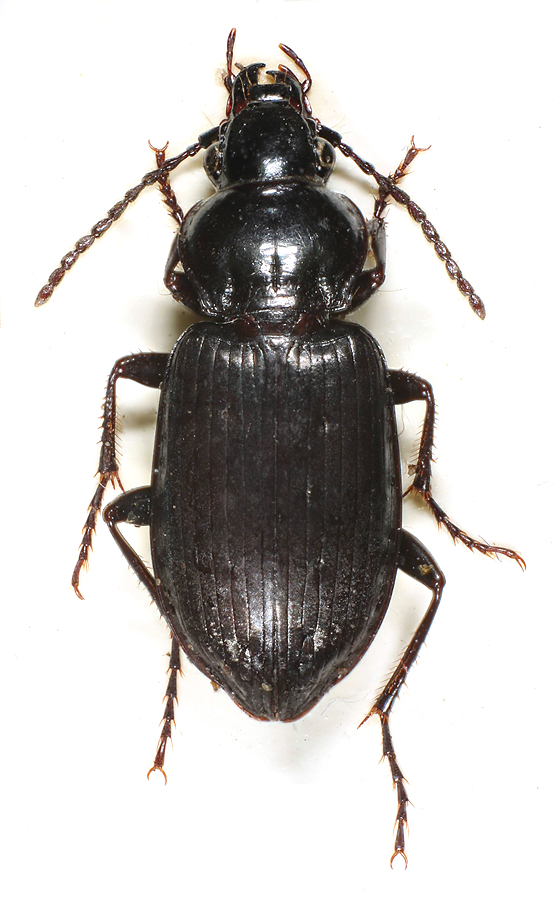

Scientific classification
- Kingdom: Animalia
- Phylum: Arthropoda
- Class: Insecta
- Order: Coleoptera
- Suborder: Adephaga
- Family: Carabidae
- Subfamily: Pterostichinae
- Tribe: Pterostichini
- Genus: Pterostichus
- Species: P. adstrictus

Binomial name
- Pterostichus adstrictus Eschscholtz, 1823

= Pterostichus adstrictus =

Species of beetle

Pterostichus adstrictus is a species of ground beetle with a Holarctic distribution. It is widespread in North America, ranging from the coast of the Bering Sea to Newfoundland, and south to Pennsylvania, Indiana, South Dakota, New Mexico, and the Sierra Nevada in California. It is also found in Europe and Russia.
