= Eschscholtz Bay =

Arm of Kotzebue Sound, Alaska, U.S.

Coordinates: 66°18′29″N 161°19′02″W

Eschscholtz Bay is an arm of Kotzebue Sound, on the Chukchi Sea-facing coast of the U.S. state of Alaska. It is up to eleven miles wide, and separated from the outer Kotzebue Sound by Choris Peninsula and Chamisso Island.

It is located on the northern coast of the Seward Peninsula, 45 miles southwest of Selawik, Kotzebue-Kobuk Low.

Eschscholtz Bay was discovered and named in 1816 by Lt. Otto von Kotzebue after his ship's physician, Dr. Johann Friedrich von Eschscholtz.

The Inuit name of this bay has not been reported, but it was a traditional beluga hunting ground for the local people of the area.
