= Hymenoplia pardoalcaidei =

Scientific classification
- Kingdom: Animalia
- Phylum: Arthropoda
- Clade: Pancrustacea
- Class: Insecta
- Order: Coleoptera
- Suborder: Polyphaga
- Infraorder: Scarabaeiformia
- Family: Scarabaeidae
- Genus: Hymenoplia
- Species: H. pardoalcaidei

Binomial name
- Hymenoplia pardoalcaidei López-Colón & Bahillo de la Puebla, 2014

Species of beetle

Hymenoplia pardoalcaidei is a species of beetle of the family Scarabaeidae. It is found in Spain.

== Description ==
Adults reach a length of about 5.6–6.2 mm (0.22–0.24 in). They have a sub-oval, entirely black body.

== Etymology ==
The species is named in honour of the Spanish entomologist D. Anselmo Pardo Alcaide.
