= Leontiy Spafaryev =

Leontiy Spafaryev Леонтий Васильевич Спафарьев
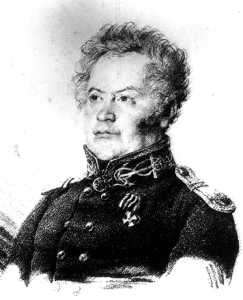
- Born: 19 March 1765
- Died: 30 January 1847 (aged 81); Saint Petersburg, Russia
- Military career
- Allegiance: Russia
- Branch: Russian Navy; Russian Lighthouse Admin.
- Service years: 1777–1838
- Rank: Lieutenant-General
- Commands: Transport vessel "Margarita"; Frigates "Narva", "Warrior", "Revel" and "Our Lady of Tikhvin"; Reval Harbour
- Conflicts: Russo-Swedish War
- Awards: Order of St. George 4th class (1802); Order of Saint Anna 1st class (1824)

Knight Leontiy Vassilievich Spafaryev (Russian: Леонтий Васильевич Спафарьев; 19 March 1765 – 30 January 1847) was a lieutenant general of the Imperial Russian Navy. Spafaryev was director of lighthouses in the Gulf of Finland and cartographer of the Russian Admiralty.

== Career ==
Spafariev was an important contributor to the improvement of navigation along the Russian coasts. The first lighthouses in Russia were built during tsar Peter the Great's drive for reform and modernization at the beginning of the 18th century. However, it was only in 1807, when the Russian Lighthouse Administration was created under the Russian Hydrographic Service, that the Russian lighthouse system followed an organized pattern, becoming effective and efficient. This office was established by the Russian Navy and it began under the leadership of Leontiy V. Spafaryev. In 1820, Spafariev published his essay "Description of the lighthouses of Finland and Gulf of Riga", a highly valued work by hydrographers.

As a cartographer, perhaps his most outstanding work is the "Atlas of the Gulf of Finland", published in 1817. His name is spelt as "Spafarief" or "Spafarieff" in the United States.

== Honours ==
The Spafaryev Islands in the Sea of Okhotsk and Spafarief Bay in the coast of Alaska were named after Leontiy V. Spafaryev.
