= Chamisso Island =

Island in Kotzebue Sound, Alaska

Native name: Iguaġvik
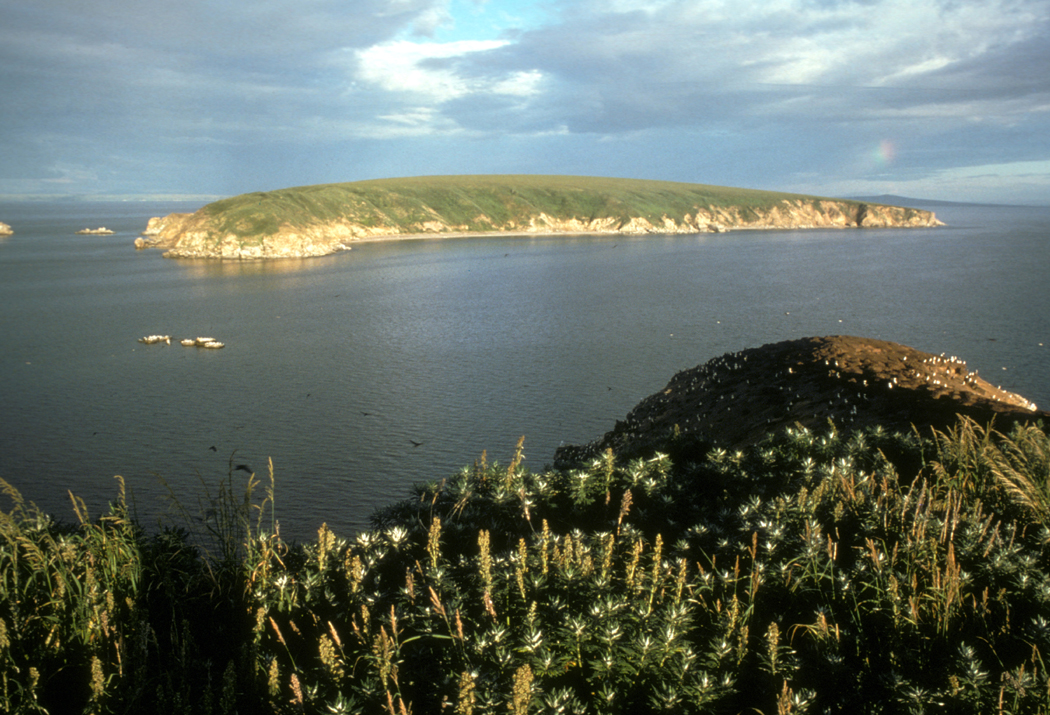
- View of Chamisso Island as seen from Puffin Island
- Interactive map of Chamisso Island

Geography
- Location: 66°13′07″N 161°49′33″W
- Length: 1.4 mi (2.3 km)
- Width: 0.125 mi (0.201 km)
- Highest elevation: 226 ft (68.9 m)

Administration
- United States
- State: Alaska

Chamisso Island (Iñupiaq: Iguaġvik) is a small island in Kotzebue Sound, Alaska. It is located off Spafarief Bay at the mouth of Eschscholtz Bay, just south of the Choris Peninsula.

The island is roughly triangular. It is 1.4 miles (2.3 km) long and an 0.125 miles (0.201 km) wide. The highest point on Chamisso Island is 226 feet (68.9 m) above sea level. It comprises one large sand spit and a low beach zone surrounding a covering of tundra with a few marshy bogs. Although Chamisso Island is much larger, nearby Puffin Island houses many more nesting birds, especially horned puffins, black-legged kittiwakes, and thick-billed murres which build their nests on the steep-walled cliffs that fall into Spafarief Bay. Iñupiat cross from the mainland to gather eggs, primarily from kittiwakes and murres. With the exception of birds and the occasional fox that crosses frozen sea in winter, nothing lives on the islands. Walruses, seals, and whales can often be seen in Spafarief Bay.

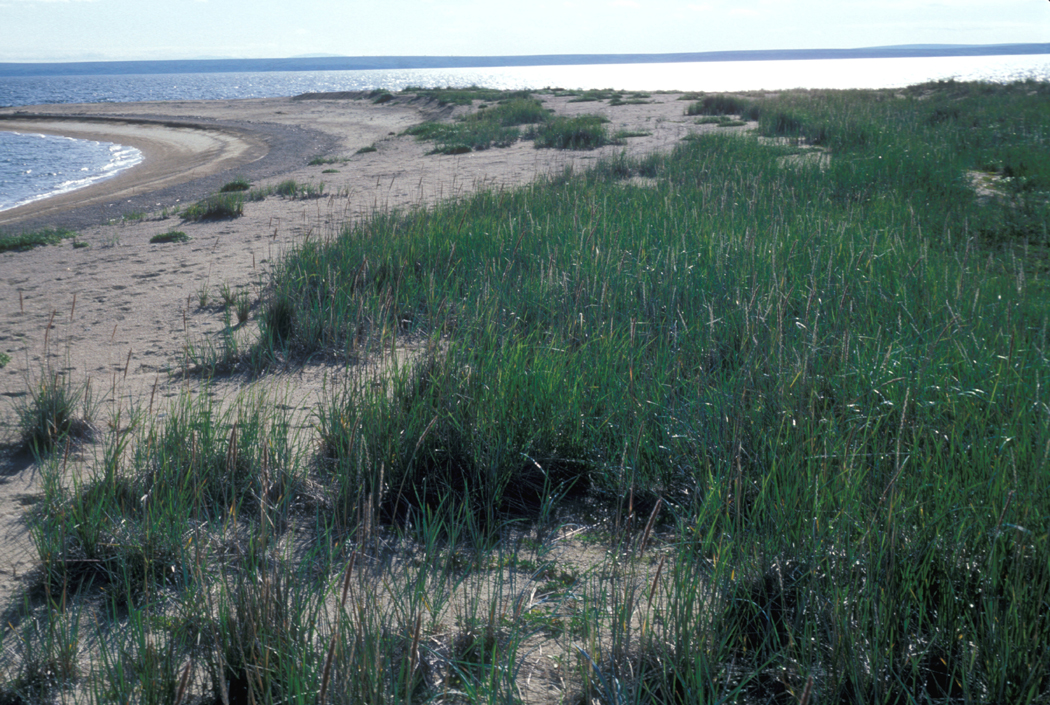
Chamisso Island sand spit

Chamisso Island has been a Natural Reserve since December 7, 1912. The protected area, the Chamisso Wilderness, includes Chamisso Island and nearby Puffin Island, as well as some rocky islets nearby. Both islands are part of the Chukchi Sea unit of the Alaska Maritime National Wildlife Refuge.

This island was named after naturalist Adelbert von Chamisso, who reached the island in 1816.

== See also ==
- List of islands of Alaska
