= Louis Choris =

German-Russian painter and explorer (1795–1828)

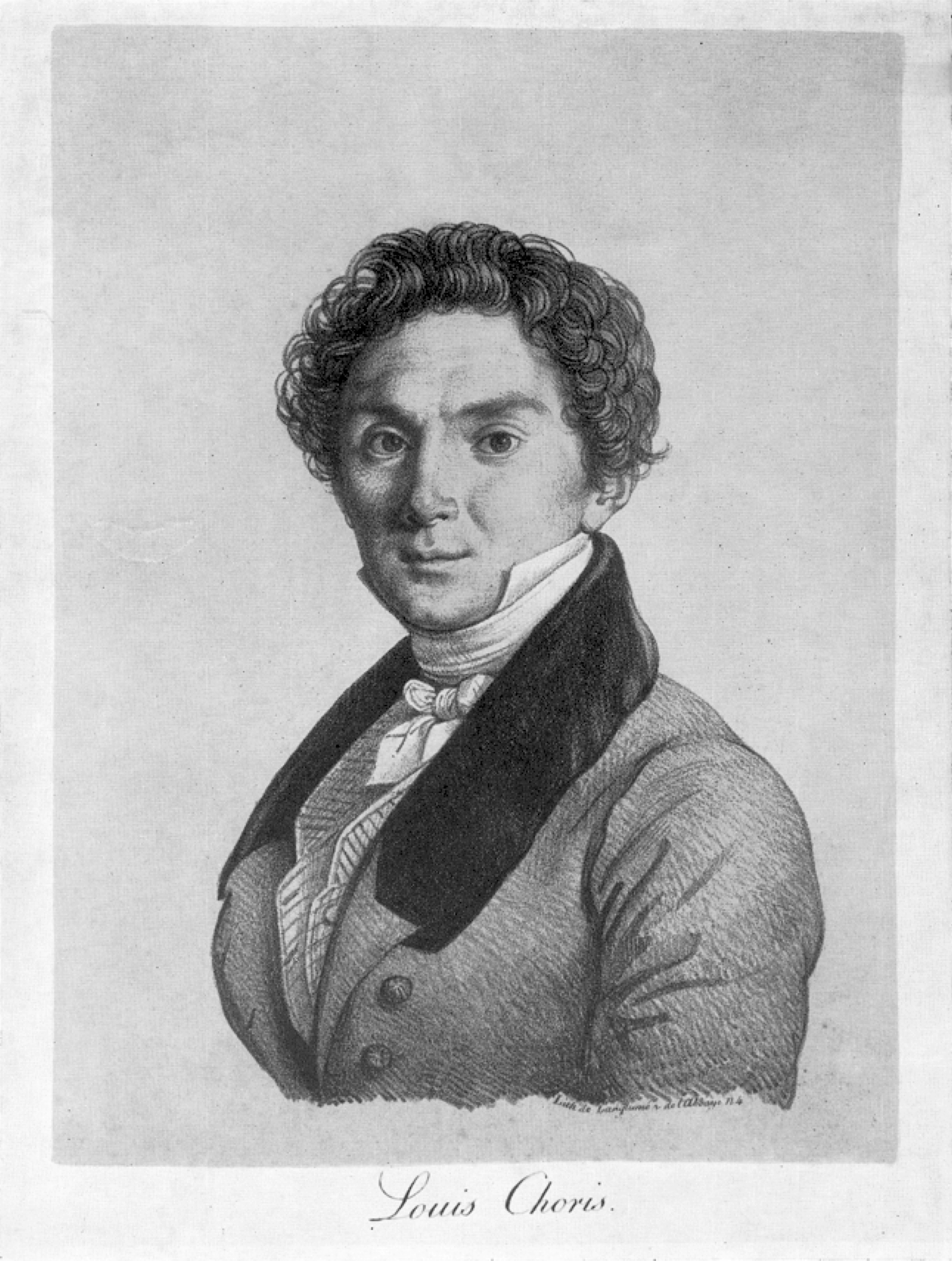
Louis Choris, lithograph by Joseph Langlumé after a self-portrait of Choris

Louis Choris (Russian: Логгин (Людвиг) Андреевич Хорис, romanized: Loggin (Lyudvig) Andreyevich Khoris; 22 March 1795 – 22 March 1828) was a German-Russian painter and explorer.

== Biography ==
Louis Choris was born in Yekaterinoslav, Russian Empire (now Dnipro, Ukraine) to German-Russian parents on 22 March 1795. In 1816, he visited the Pacific and the west coast of North America on board the Russian expeditionary ship Rurik, serving as an artist with the Romanzoff expedition under the command of Lieutenant Otto von Kotzebue, which was tasked with exploring a northwest passage.

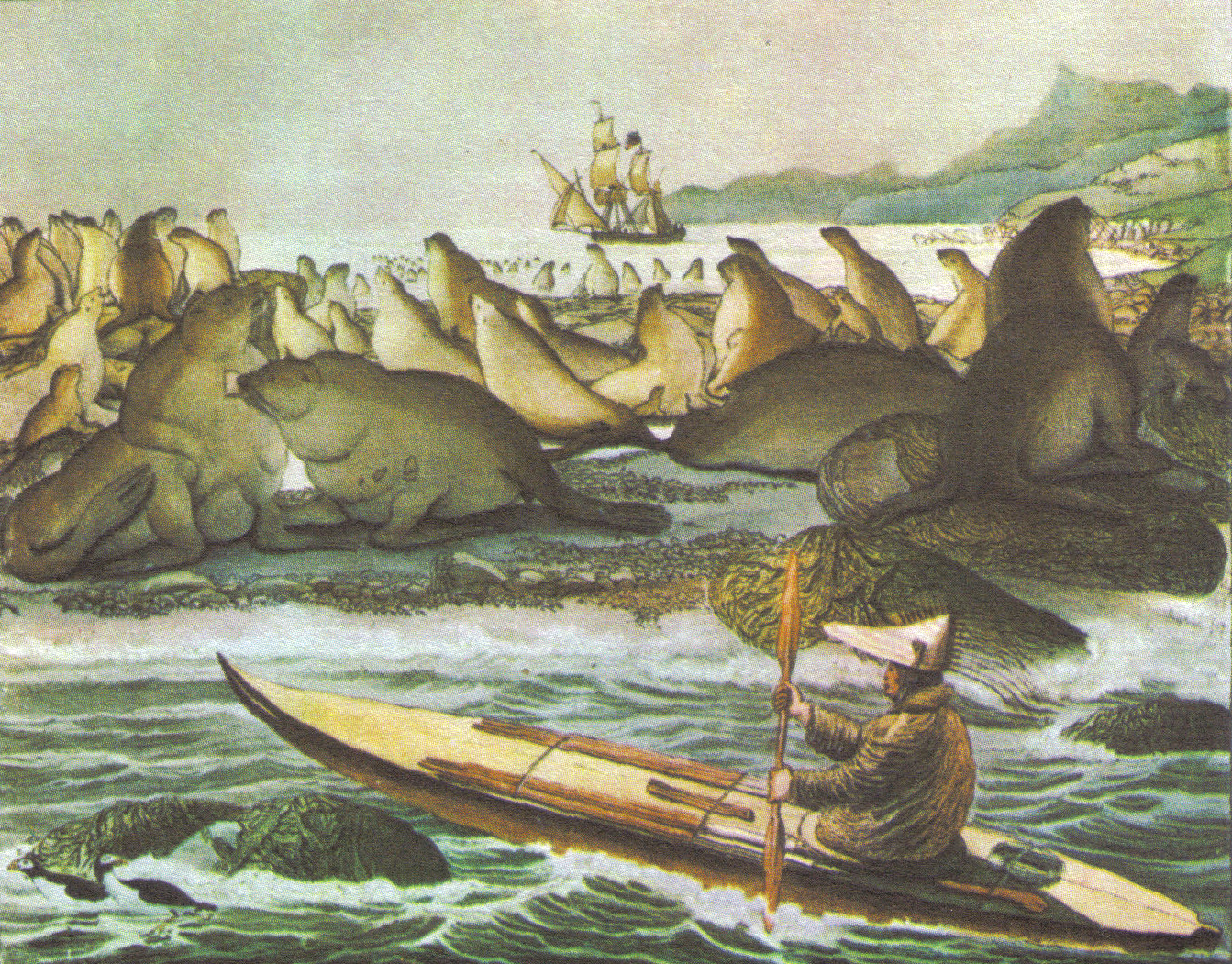
The Russian "Rurik" sets anchor near Saint Paul Island in the Bering Sea in order to load food and equipment for the expedition to the Chukchi Sea in the north. Drawing by Louis Choris in 1817.

In terms of his work as an artist, Choris is said to have "painted nature as he found it. The essence of his art is truth; a fresh, vigorous view of life, and an originality in portrayal." His illustrations on the Romanzoff expedition are therefore likely to faithfully represent the subjects he painted. After the voyage of the Rurik, Choris went to Paris where he issued a portfolio of his drawings in lithographic reproduction and studied in the ateliers of Gerard and Regnault. Choris worked extensively in pastels and documented the Ohlone people in the missions of San Francisco, California in 1816. Choris left France in 1827 for South America and was killed by robbers on 22 March 1828, en route to Vera Cruz, Mexico.

Choris' works are now held in public collections by such museums as the Anchorage Museum of History and Art, the Honolulu Museum of Art and the Oakland Museum of California.

== Legacy ==
Otto von Kotzebue named the Choris Peninsula after Choris.

== Gallery ==
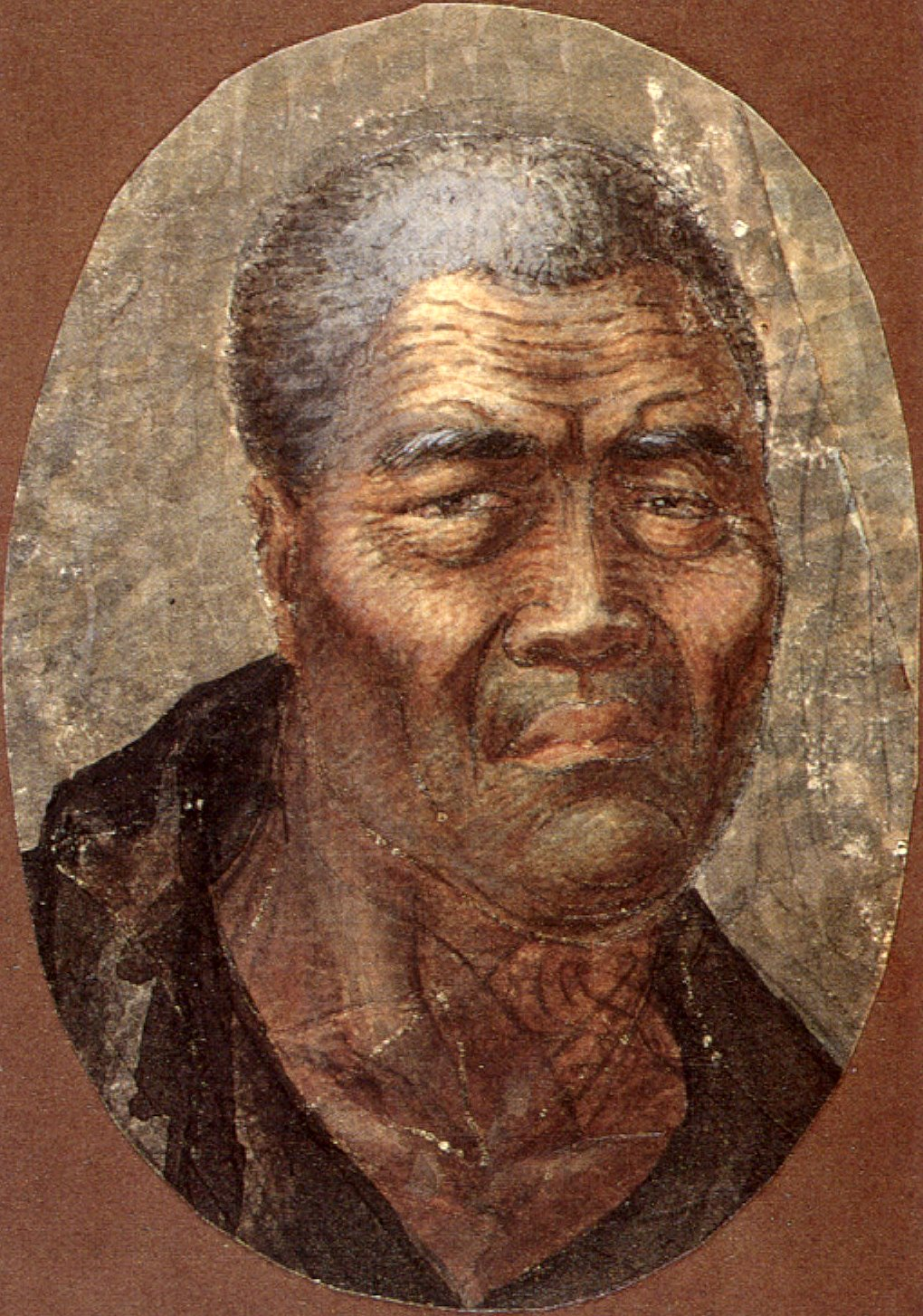
Kamehameha, King of the Sandwich Islands, pen and watercolor by Choris, 1816, Honolulu Museum of Art

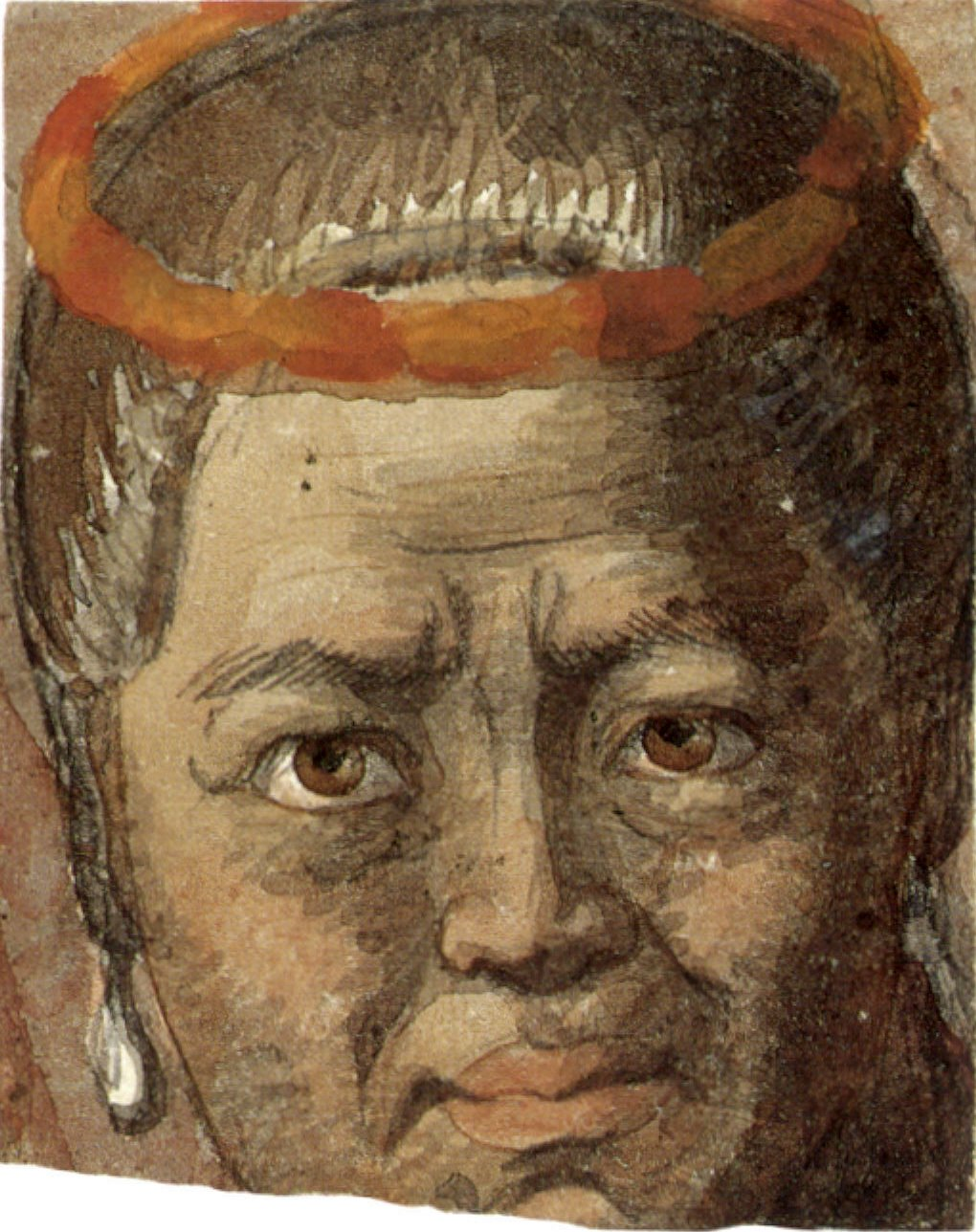
Kaahumanu, Woman of the Sandwich Islands, pen, ink wash and watercolor, 1816, Honolulu Museum of Art

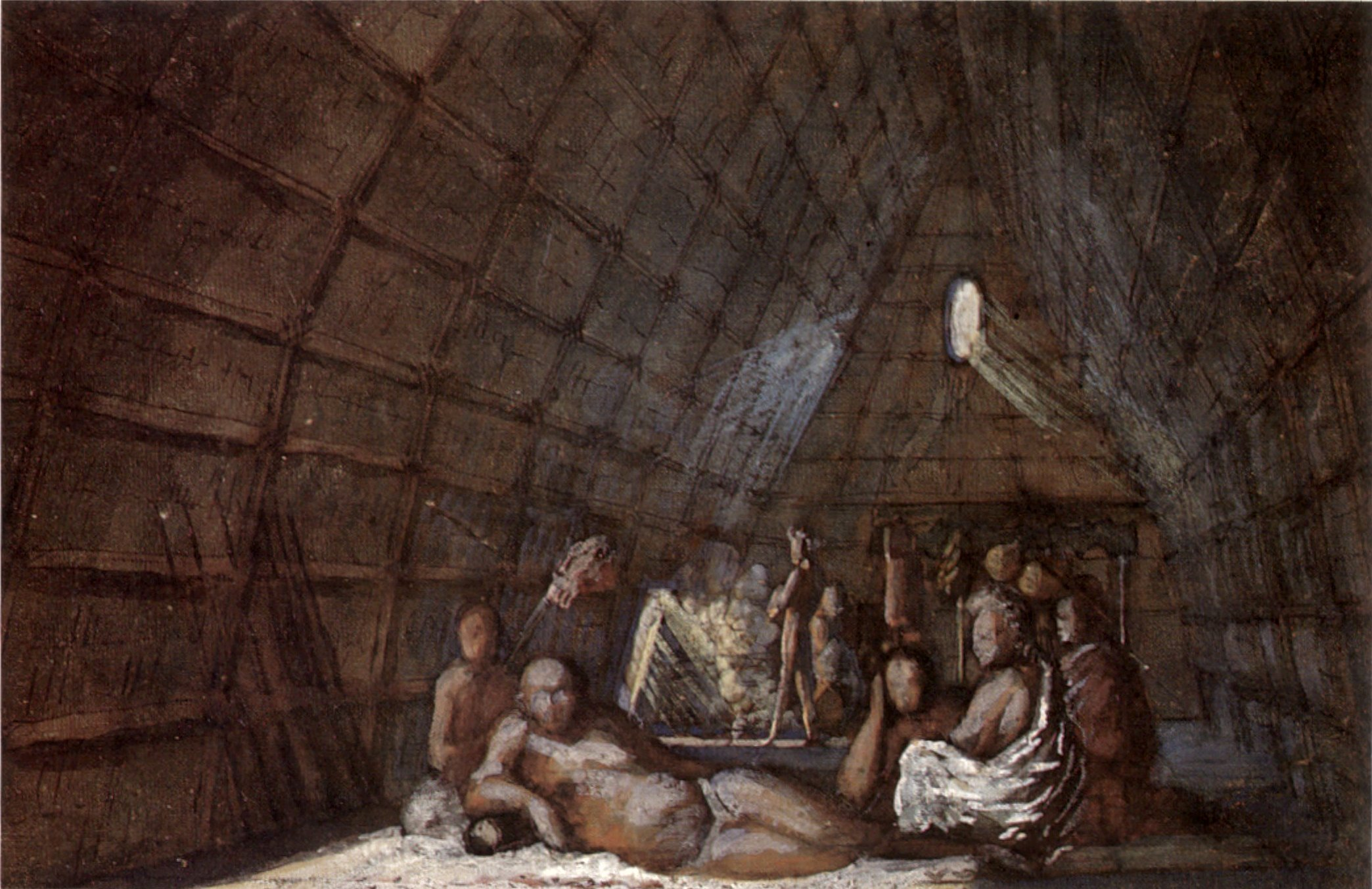
Interior of a House of a Chief of the Sandwich Islands, pen, watercolor and gouache, 1816, Honolulu Academy of Arts

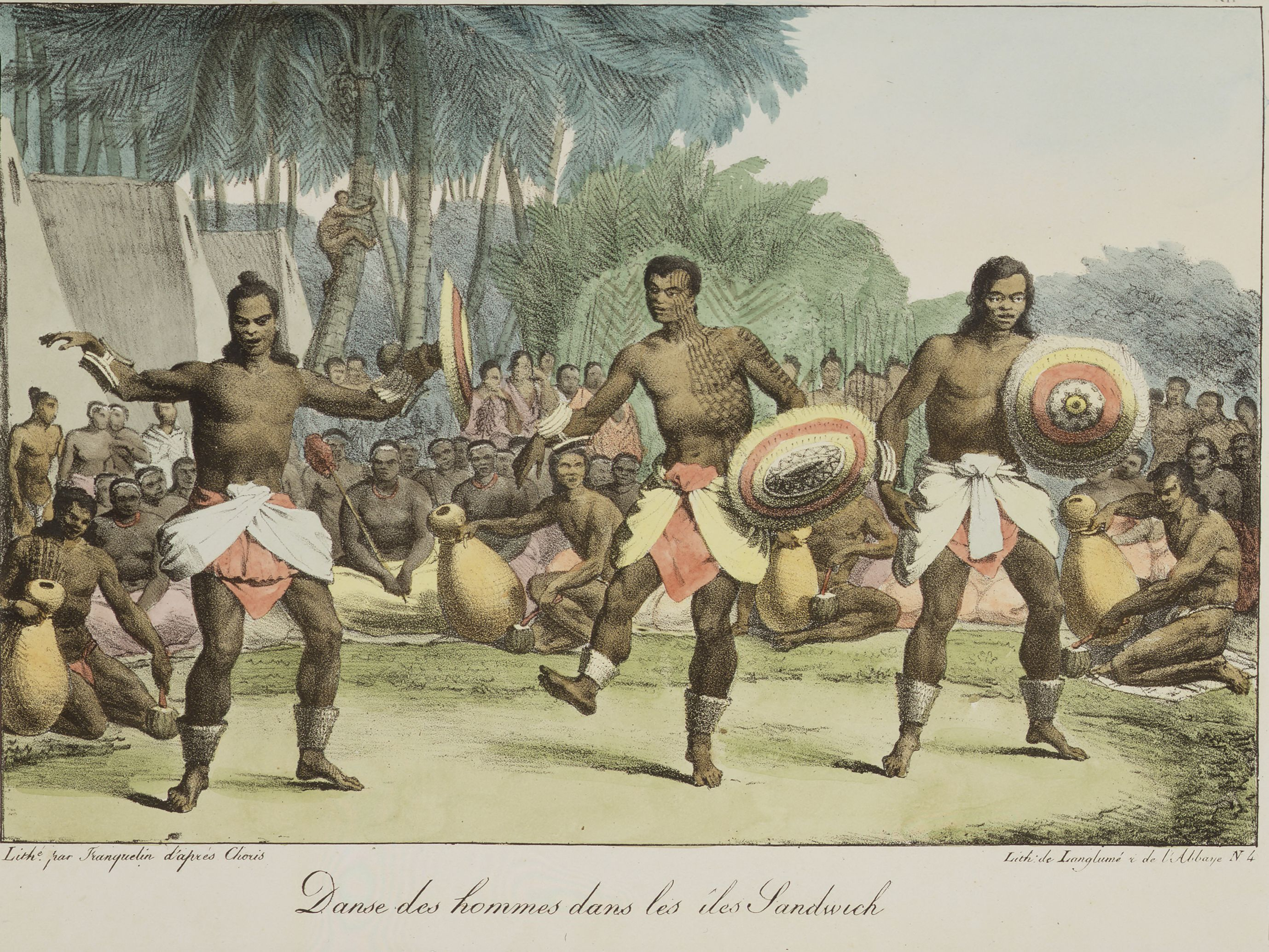
Men's dance in the Sandwich Islands, 1816, published 1822, National Library of New Zealand

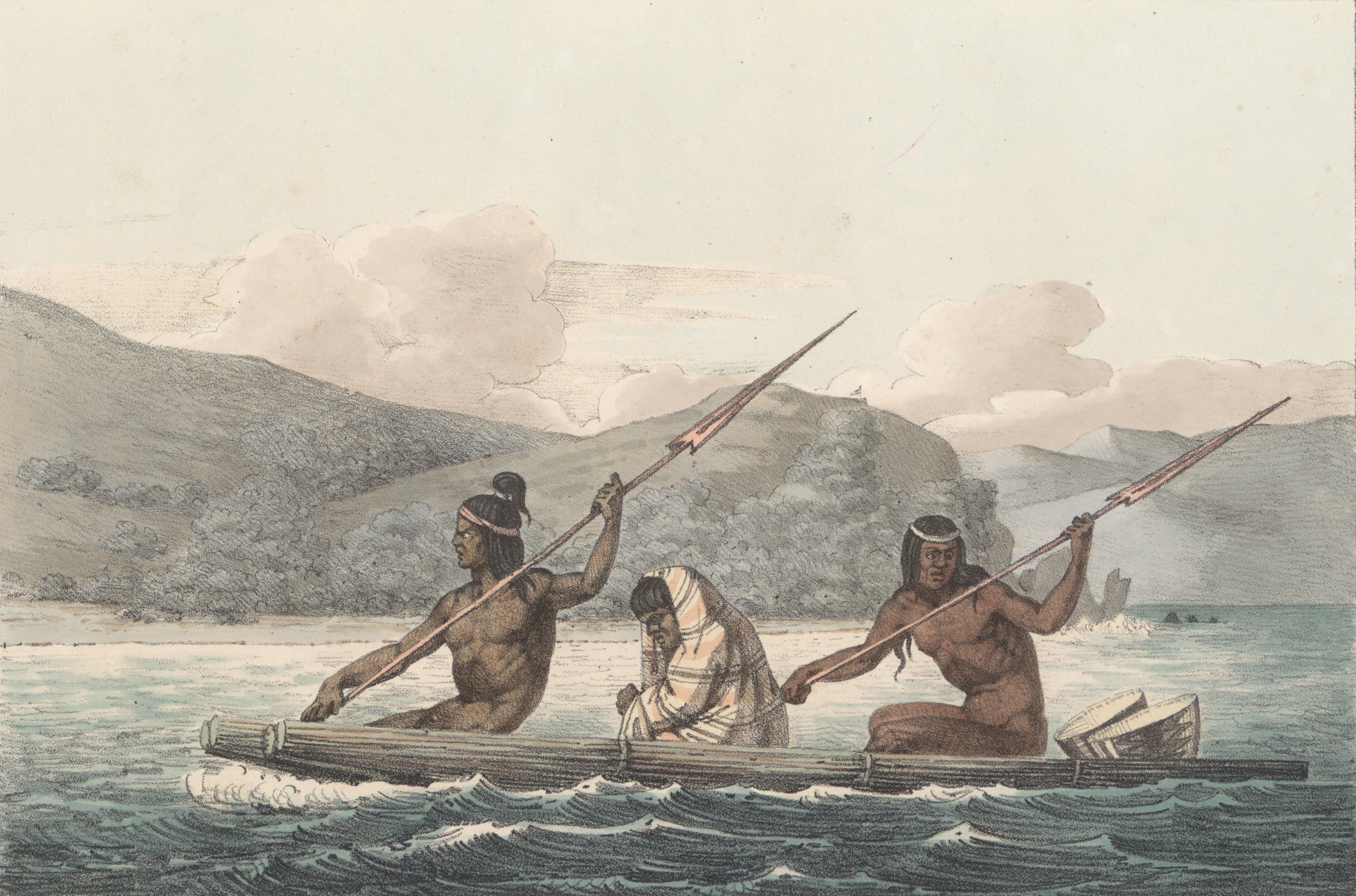
Ohlone Indians in a Tule Boat in the San Francisco Bay, 1816, published 1822

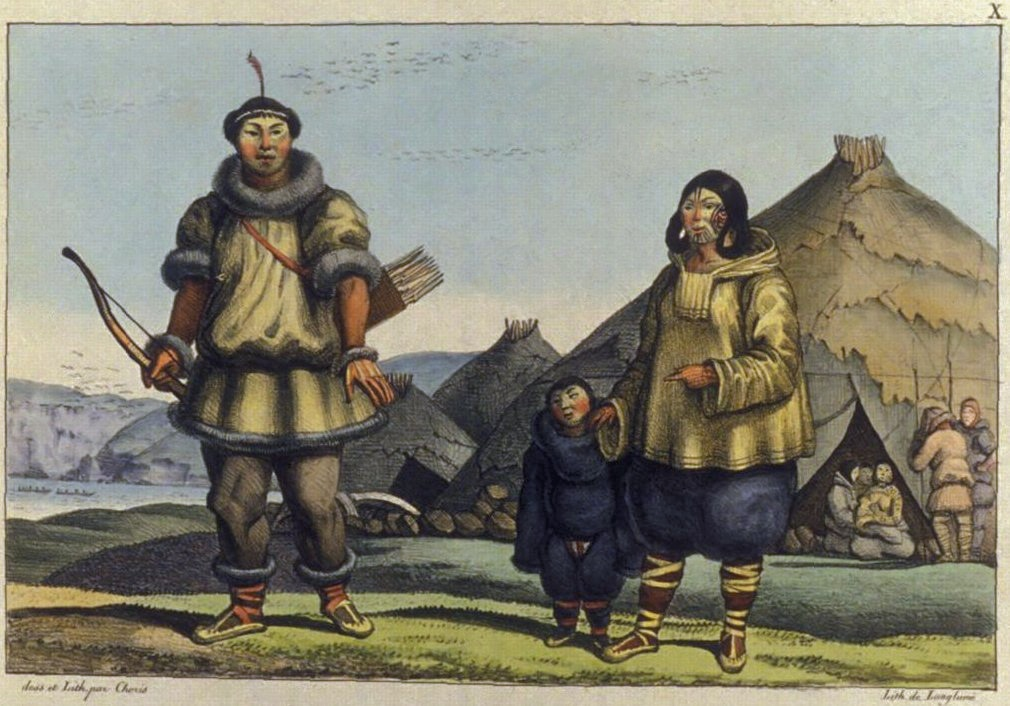
A Chukchi family in front of their home near the Bering Strait, summer 1816.

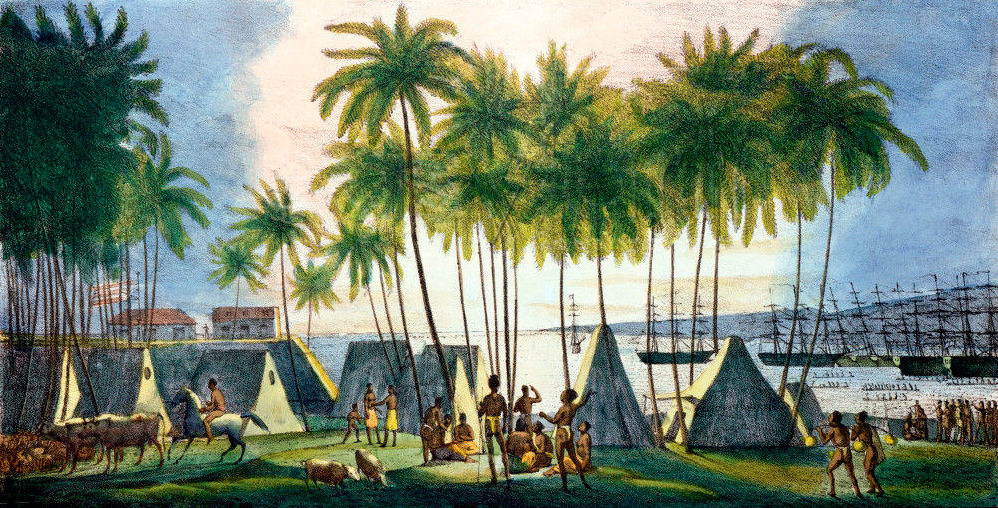
Port of Honolulu as seen by Choris in 1816

== Literature ==
- "Хорис, Логгин Андреевич" . Brockhaus and Efron Encyclopedic Dictionary (in Russian). 1906.
- Daum, Andreas W., German Naturalists in the Pacific around 1800: Entanglement, Autonomy, and a Transnational Culture of Expertise. In Explorations and Entanglements: Germans in Pacific Worlds from the Early Modern Period to World War I, ed. Hartmut Berghoff et al. New York, Berghahn Books, 2019, 70‒102.
- Ellis, George R., Honolulu Academy of Arts, Selected Works, Honolulu, Honolulu Academy of Arts, 1990, 181.
- Forbes, David W., Encounters with Paradise: Views of Hawaii and its People, 1778–1941, Honolulu Academy of Arts, 1992, 23–62.
