= Hymenoplia arragonica =

Scientific classification
- Kingdom: Animalia
- Phylum: Arthropoda
- Clade: Pancrustacea
- Class: Insecta
- Order: Coleoptera
- Suborder: Polyphaga
- Infraorder: Scarabaeiformia
- Family: Scarabaeidae
- Genus: Hymenoplia
- Species: H. arragonica

Binomial name
- Hymenoplia arragonica Escalera, 1927

Species of beetle

Hymenoplia arragonica is a species of beetle of the family Scarabaeidae. It is found in Spain.

== Description ==
Adults reach a length of about 5.5–6.5 mm (0.22–0.26 in). They have a not very elongated body. Males are quite hairy, while females are less so. The hairs are silvery-white or sometimes pale brownish. Males are brownish-black, while females often have the apical part of the elytra reddish, with the basal area dark reddish-brown. The legs are dark reddish-brown in pale specimens and darker in others.
