= Hymenoplia castiliana =

Scientific classification
- Kingdom: Animalia
- Phylum: Arthropoda
- Clade: Pancrustacea
- Class: Insecta
- Order: Coleoptera
- Suborder: Polyphaga
- Infraorder: Scarabaeiformia
- Family: Scarabaeidae
- Genus: Hymenoplia
- Species: H. castiliana

Binomial name
- Hymenoplia castiliana Reitter, 1890

Synonyms
- Hymenoplia castiliana rubicundissima Báguena, 1954

Species of beetle

Hymenoplia castiliana is a species of beetle of the family Scarabaeidae. It is found in Spain.
