= Nikolay Rumyantsev =

Russian diplomat, minister, chancellor (1809–1826)

Count Nikolay Rumyantsev
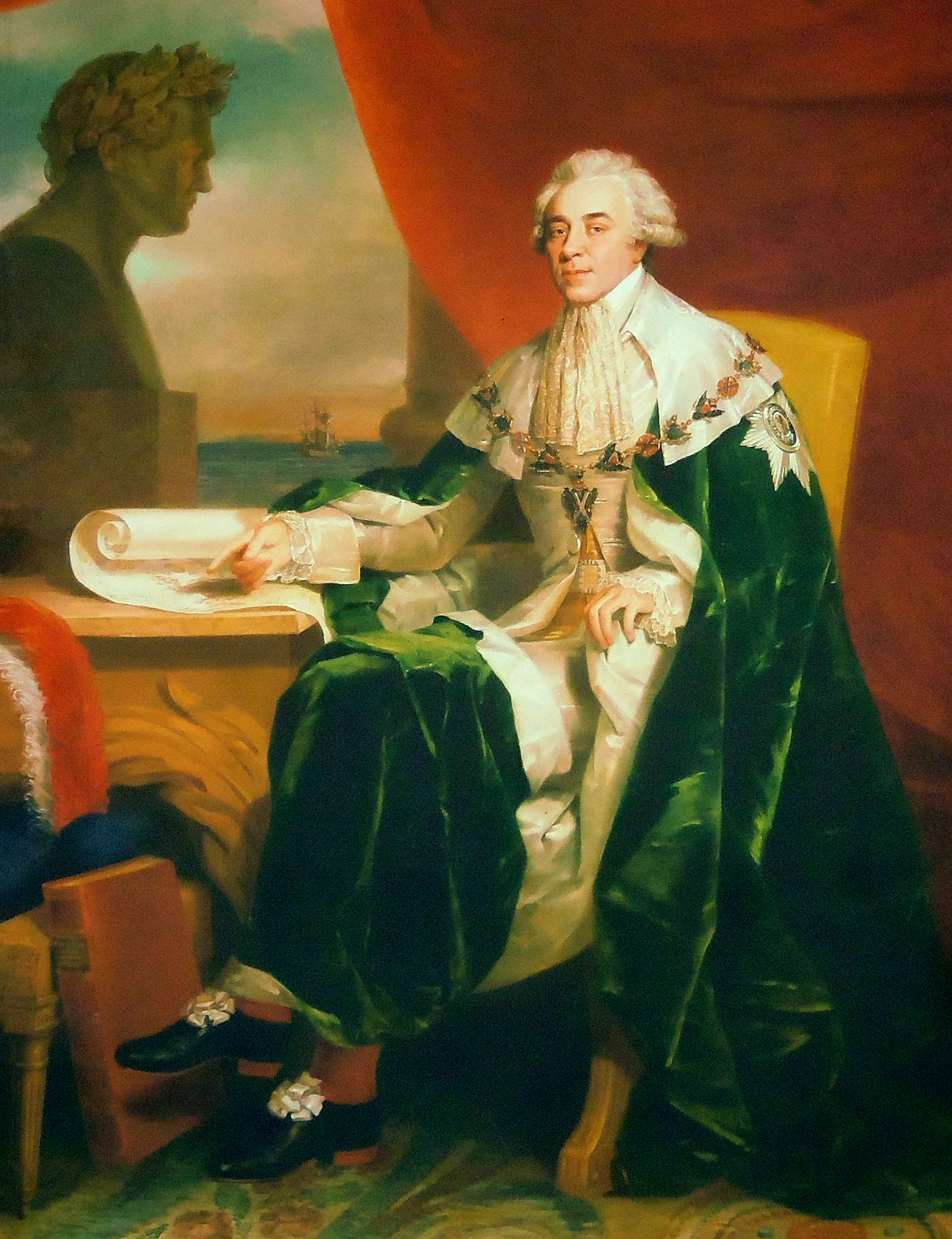
- Posthumous portrait by George Dawe

Ministers of Foreign Affairs of the Russian Empire
- In office 1808–1814

Chancellor of the Russian Empire
- In office 1809–1826

Personal details
- Born: 1754
- Died: 1826 (aged 71–72)
- Parent(s): Pyotr Rumyantsev, Yekaterina Rumyantseva
- Education: Leiden University
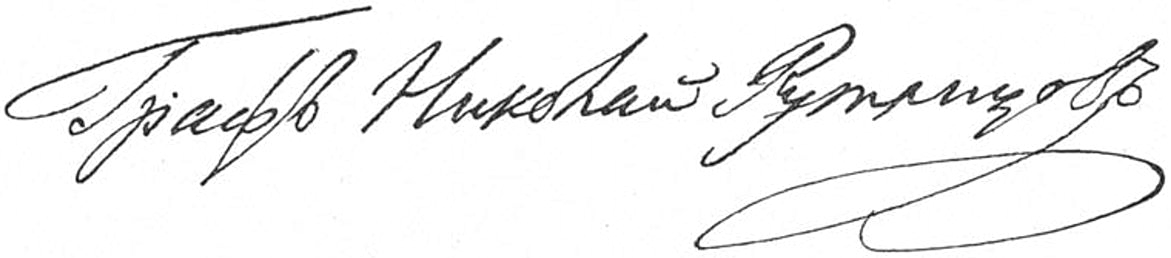
- Signature

Count Nikolay Petrovich Rumyantsev (Russian: Никола́й Петро́вич Румя́нцев; 3 April 1754 – 3 January 1826), born in Saint Petersburg, was Russia's Foreign Minister and Chancellor of the Russian Empire in the run-up to Napoleon's invasion of Russia (1808–12). He was the son of Field Marshal Pyotr Rumyantsev-Zadunaisky from the Rumyantsev comital family.

== Background ==
Rumyantsev and his brother were provided with basic education at home. Their mentor was Friedrich Melchior, Baron von Grimm. In 1774 they went to Leiden University where they studied history, law and language.

== Official career ==
Rumyantsev was the first envoy of Russia to the Holy Roman Empire after Russia became a guarantor of the imperial constitution through the Treaty of Teschen (1779). He arrived in 1782 accredited as ambassador to the Electoral Rhenish Circle, Upper Rhenish Circle, Swabian Circle, Franconian Circle, Electorate of Mainz, Electorate of Cologne, Palatine Zweibrücken, Duchy of Württemberg, Margraviate of Baden and Landgraviate of Hesse-Kassel. Although he acted as the representative of Russia as guarantor of the peace, he was considered by Germans to be a partisan of Austria.

During the first years of the 19th century, Rumyantsev was very influential with Alexander I and his mother Maria Fyodorovna, serving as Minister of Commerce (1802–1811) and President of the State Council (1810–1812).

As Foreign Minister (appointed 1808), he advocated a closer alliance with France. Represented Russia at the Treaty of Fredrikshamn. On receiving the news of Napoleon's invasion of Russia (1812), he suffered a stroke and lost his hearing. When Napoleon entered Moscow, he advised the Emperor to dismiss Kutuzov and to seek peace at any cost. Eventually Alexander lost all confidence in Nikolay Petrovich, who retired in 1814 just before the Congress of Vienna.

Nicholas Rumyantsev died on 3 January 1826 in his neo-Palladian palace on English Quay in St Petersburg. His statue stands in front of the Gomel Palace in Belarus.

== Scholarly pursuits ==
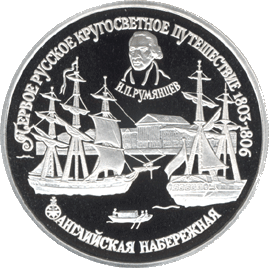

During the years of his foreign service, Nikolay Petrovich amassed a huge collection of historical documents, rare coins, maps, manuscripts, and incunabula which formed a nucleus of the Rumyantsev Museum in Moscow (subsequently transformed into the State Russian Library). Showing a keen interest in Russian history, Rumyantsev produced the first printed publications of several old Russian chronicles and ancient literary monuments of the Eastern Slavs. He presided over a circle of young antiquaries (such as Pavel Stroev and Ivan Snegirev) that later drifted into the Slavophile camp.

Rumyantsev also became a notable patron of the Russian voyages of exploration. He sponsored the first Russian circumnavigation of the globe. He also funded the Rurik expedition led by Otto von Kotzebue. As a result, his name came to be attached to such exotic things as:

- Spiranthes romanzoffiana, a North American orchid
- Papilio rumanzovia, a large butterfly from the Philippines
- Syagrus romanzoffiana, the Queen or Coco Palm tree of South America
- Romanzoffia, a genus of flowering plants in the waterleaf family from North America
- Romanzovite, another name for grossular, a type of garnet stone
- between 1812 and 1842 the Russian name (залив Румянцева) for present day Bodega Bay, California
- the Romanzof Mountains in Alaska and Yukon Territory
- Cape Romanzof in Alaska, itself giving its name to Cape Romanzof LRRS Airport
- Romanzov Island, now called Tikei
- Romanzoff Bay, in La Pérouse Strait

In 1811 he commissioned sculptor Canova to create a statue of peace in recognition of the peacemaking efforts of his family.
