= Spafarief Bay =

- Bay
- Location within Alaska
- Coordinates: 66°5′50″N 161°50′51″W
- Country: United States
- State: Alaska

Spafarief Bay is a bay in the Kotzebue Sound, on the Chukchi Sea-facing coast of Alaska. Its size is 15 mi. across. There is a lagoon at its southern end.

The Spafarief Bay is located on the northern coast of the Seward Peninsula, 10 mi. north of the mining town of Candle; Kotzebue-Kobuk Low.

== Etymology ==
Spafarief Bay was named in 1816 by Lt. Otto von Kotzebue, of the Imperial Russian Navy after Russian Major General knight Leontiy Spafaryev (1765–1847), Director of the Russian Lighthouse Administration and cartographer of the Russian Admiralty.

The Inuit name of this bay has not been reported.
