= Choris Peninsula =

Cape in Alaska, United States

Coordinates: 66°17′05″N 161°52′50″W

The Choris Peninsula is a cape in Alaska. It is located in the east of Kotzebue Sound on the Chukchi Sea coast.

The Choris Peninsula is a small headland pointing southwards. Chamisso Island lies off its southern tip.

It was named in 1816 by Lt. Otto von Kotzebue IRN, for Louis Choris, a member of his expedition.

== See also ==
- Chamisso Wilderness
