= Johann Friedrich von Eschscholtz =

Baltic German explorer and scientist (1793–1831)

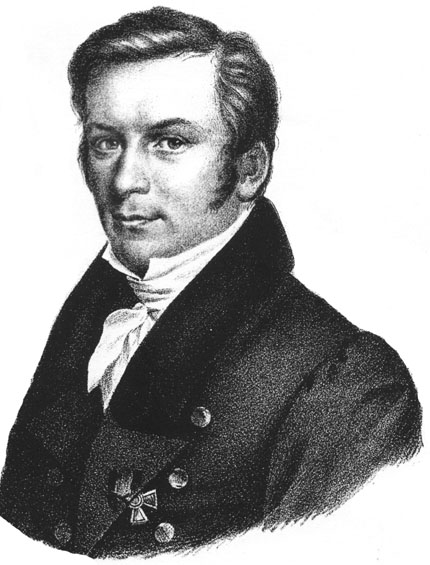
- Born: 12 November [O.S. 1 November] 1793; Dorpat, Kreis Dorpat, Riga Viceroyalty, Russian Empire
- Died: 19 May [O.S. 7 May] 1831 (aged 37); Dorpat, Kreis Dorpat, Governorate of Livonia, Russian Empire
- Education: Imperial University of Dorpat
- Spouse: Christine Friedrike Ledebour
- Scientific career
- Fields: Botany; entomology
- Workplaces: Imperial University of Dorpat
- Author abbrev. (botany): Eschsch.

Johann Friedrich Gustav von Eschscholtz (Note: In German personal names, von is a preposition which approximately means 'of' or 'from' and usually denotes some sort of nobility. While von (always lower case) is part of the family name or territorial designation, not a first or middle name, if the noble is referred to by their last name, use Schiller, Clausewitz or Goethe, not von Schiller, etc.) (German pronunciation: [ˈjoːhan ˈfʁiːdʁɪç fɔn ˈʔɛʃʃɔlts]; 1 November 1793 – 7 May 1831) was a Baltic German physician, naturalist, and entomologist. He was one of the earliest scientific explorers of the Pacific region, making significant collections of flora and fauna in Alaska, California, and Hawaii.

== Biography ==
Eschscholtz was born in the Livonian city of Dorpat, then part of the Russian Empire. His parents, Johann Gottfried and Katherine Hedwig Ziegler Eschscholtz were ethnic Baltic Germans. He studied medicine and zoology at the University of Dorpat and served as an assistant to Carl Friedrich von Ledebour, a professor of botany. Eschscholtz received a medical degree in 1815.

=== First voyage ===
On the recommendation of Ledebour, Eschscholtz served as surgeon and naturalist on the Russian expeditionary ship Rurik under the command of Otto von Kotzebue. From 1815 to 1818 the expedition circumnavigated the globe for the purposes of seeking a Northwest Passage and exploring the lands bordering the Pacific Ocean. In addition to Eschscholtz, the scientific team included botanist Adelbert von Chamisso and artist Louis Choris.

The expedition left Kronstadt, Russia, on 30 June 1815, stopping at the Canary Islands in September and then crossing the Atlantic to Santa Catarina, Brazil. They passed Cape Horn in January 1816 and sailed north for several months to reach Kamchatka in July. From there they spent the rest of 1816 visiting the Aleutian Islands, California, and Hawaii. At each stop Eschscholtz collected specimens and recorded his observations of the local flora and fauna. Eschscholtz and Chamisso worked well together and became good friends. When Kotzebue became ill in 1817, they cut short a planned return to the Arctic and headed home, stopping again in Hawaii and then in the Philippines before ending their voyage at St. Petersburg in August 1818.

Kotzebue published a three-volume account of the expedition, including reports from Chamisso and Eschscholtz. Their natural history collections were described in the journals Horae physicae Berolinenses (1820), the Memoires de l'Academie Imperiale des Sciences de St. Petersbourg (1826) and Linnaea (between 1826 and 1836). Eschscholtz's botanical collections from California were published under the title Descriptiones plantarum novae Californiae, adjectis florum exoticorum analysibus (1826). This was the first scientific description of California's flora and the first reference to California in the title of a scientific paper. He also published some of his entomological finds in Entomographien (1822).

After his first voyage, Eschscholtz married Christine Friedrike Ledebour and became an assistant professor at the University of Dorpat in 1819. He was later appointed director of the university's zoological museum in 1822.

=== Second voyage ===
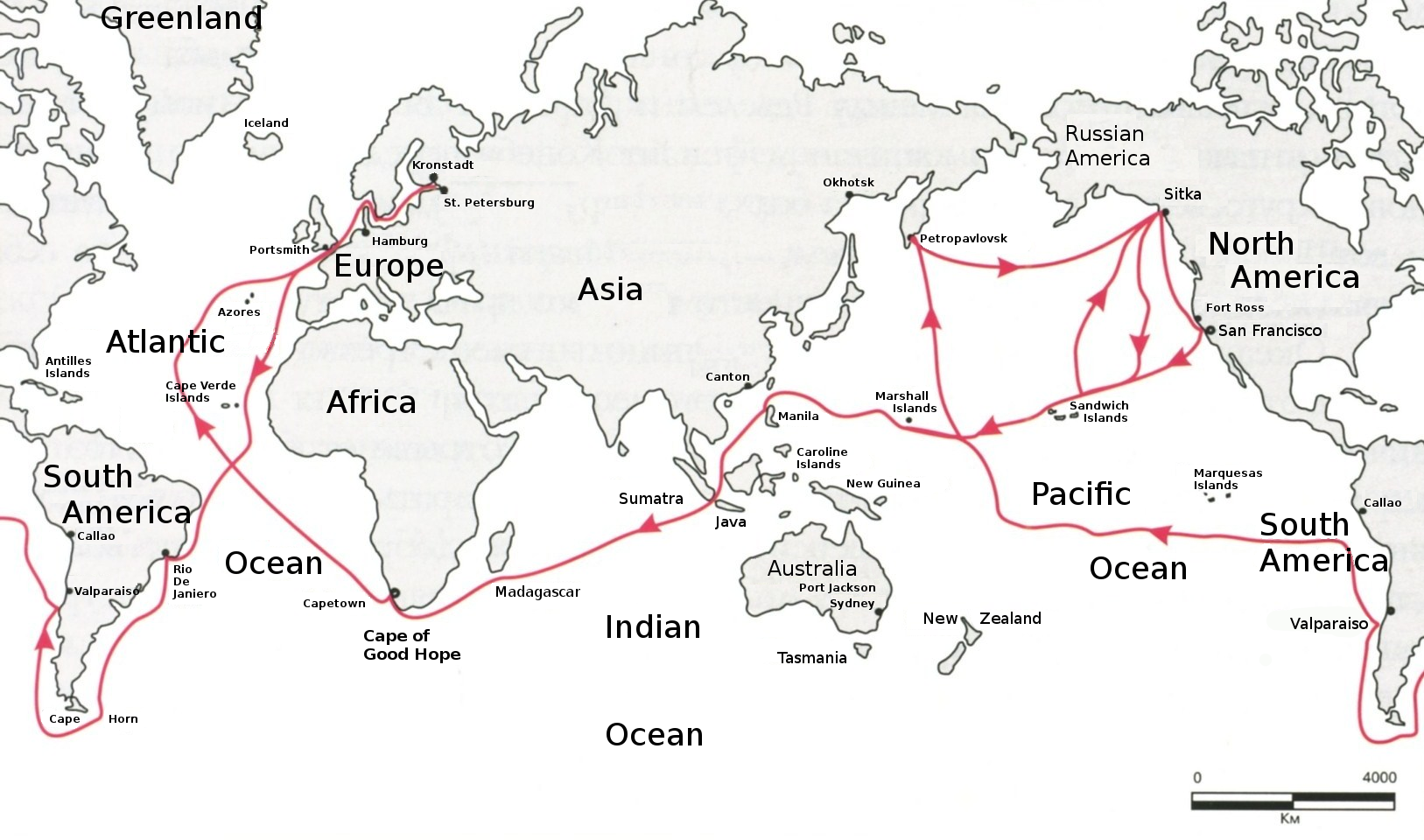
Eschscholtz's second voyage, 1823–1826.

In 1823, Kotzebue was commissioned to return to the North Pacific to resupply Kamchatka and then proceed to Alaska to protect the Russian American Company from smugglers. Eschscholtz accepted an offer to participate in this second voyage and left Kronstadt on 28 July 1823 aboard the Predpriaetie (Enterprise). Again Eschscholtz amassed significant collections of natural history specimens, especially insects. Substantial insect collections were made in Hawaii, Alaska, and California. After a voyage of three years, the expedition returned home in July 1826.

In 1830, Kotzebue and Eschscholtz published a report of their voyage titled A new voyage round the world in the years 1823, 24, 25, and 26. Eschscholtz published illustrated descriptions of the new fauna he encountered in Zoologischer Atlas, 1829-1833; and provided further information in System der Akalephen, 1829. He also continued to work at the University of Dorpat, serving as professor of medicine and zoology and director of the zoological museum.

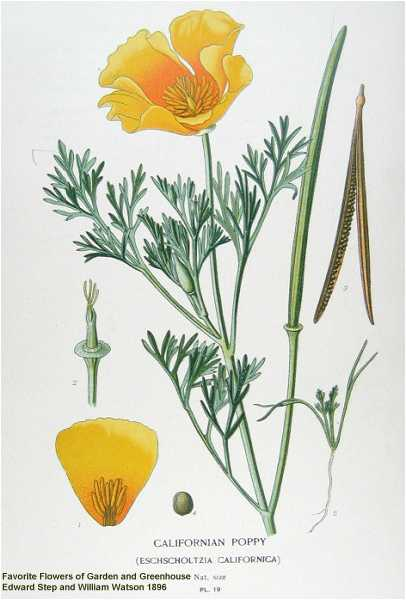
California poppy, Eschscholzia californica

Of the many insects he collected, about 100 butterflies and twenty beetles were species new to science. Eschscholtz described some of them before his death but many were described by others, including Swedish naturalist Carl Gustaf Mannerheim, French entomologist Pierre François Marie Auguste Dejean, and Russian entomologist Gotthelf Fischer von Waldheim.

Eschscholtz died on 7 May 1831 in Dorpat, Estonia at the age of 37.

== Legacy ==
His friend and colleague, Adelbert von Chamisso, named the California poppy (Eschscholzia californica) in his honor. Kotzebue named an island in the Marshall Islands as Eschscholtz Atoll. This was renamed in 1946 to Bikini Atoll. Kotzebue also named a small bay east of Kotzebue Sound, Alaska after Eschscholtz.

Most of his collections were left to the University of Dorpat Museum and the Imperial Museum of Moscow.

== See also ==
- Category:Taxa named by Johann Friedrich von Eschscholtz
- European and American voyages of scientific exploration
- List of Baltic German scientists

== Sources ==
- "Эшшольц, Иоганн-Фридрих" . Brockhaus and Efron Encyclopedic Dictionary (in Russian). 1906.
- Beidleman, Richard G. (2006). California's Frontier Naturalists. University of California Press. pp. 48–60.
- Daum, Andreas W. (2019). "German Naturalists in the Pacific around 1800: Entanglement, Autonomy, and a Transnational Culture of Expertise". In Berghoff, Hartmut (ed.). Explorations and Entanglements: Germans in Pacific Worlds from the Early Modern Period to World War I. Berghahn Books. pp. 79–102.
- "Eschscholtz, Johann Friedrich" . Encyclopædia Britannica. Vol. 9 (11th ed.). 1911. p. 765.
- Essig, E. O. (1931) History of Entomology.
- McKelvey, Susan Delano (1998). "Eschscholtz and Von Chamisso Spend a Month at the Bay of San Francisco" (PDF). Fremontia. 26 (3).
- Pont, A. C. (1995). "The dipterist C. R. W. Wiedemann (1770–1840). His life, work and collections." Steenstrupia 21: 125–54.
- Sterling, Keir B., ed. (1997). "Eschscholtz, Johann Friedrich". Biographical Dictionary of American and Canadian Naturalists and Environmentalists. Greenwood Press.
- "Eschscholtz, Johann Friedrich Gustav von (1793-1831)". JSTOR Global Plants. ITHAKA.
- "Otto von Kotzebue". Encyclopedia of World Biography. Gale. 1998.
