= Otto von Kotzebue =

Russian explorer and naval officer (1787–1846)

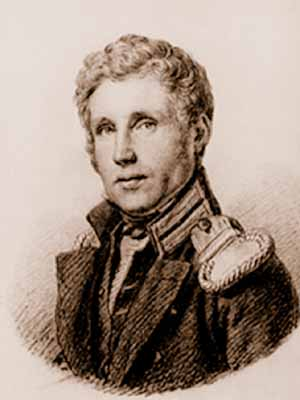
- Born: 30 December [O.S. 19 December] 1787; Reval, Russian Empire
- Died: 15 February [O.S. 3 February] 1846 (aged 58); Reval, Russian Empire
- Occupation: Military officer
- Parent: August von Kotzebue

Otto von Kotzebue (Russian: О́тто Евста́фьевич Коцебу́, romanized: Otto Yevstafyevich Kotsebu; 30 December 1787 – 15 February 1846) was a Russian navigator of Baltic German descent and an officer in the Imperial Russian Navy. He commanded two naval expeditions into the Pacific for the purposes of exploration and scientific investigation. The first expedition explored Oceania and the western coast of North America and passed through the Bering Strait in search of a passage across the Arctic Ocean. His second voyage was intended as a military resupply mission to Kamchatka but again included significant explorations of the west coast of North America and Oceania.

== Early life and education ==
Kotzebue was born and raised in Reval (Tallinn), in the Governorate of Estonia of the Russian Empire. He was the second son of German writer and diplomat August von Kotzebue. The Kotzebue family was of Brandenburgish origin; his earliest known patrilineal ancestors were from Kossebau in Altmark.

After attending the Saint Petersburg school of cadets, he accompanied Adam Johann von Krusenstern on his voyage of 1803–1806. Both attested to the prominence of Baltic Germans in Imperial Russia's naval expeditions around 1800.

== First voyage, 1815 to 1818 ==
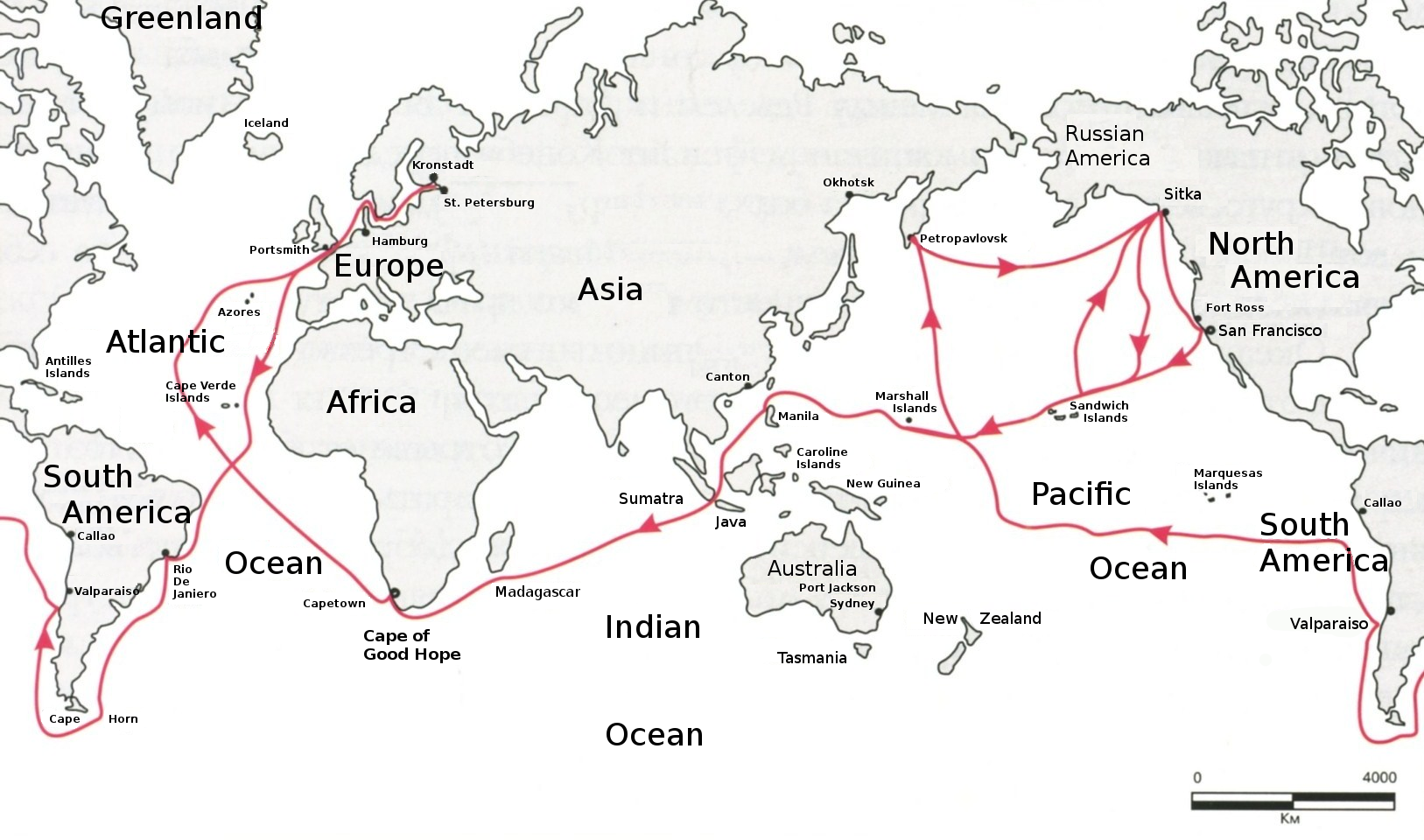
Kotzebue's travels

On promotion to lieutenant, Kotzebue was placed in command of an expedition fitted out at the expense of the imperial chancellor, Count Nikolay Rumyantsev, on the brig Rurik. In this vessel, with only twenty-seven men, including the naturalists Johann Friedrich von Eschscholtz and Adelbert von Chamisso, and the artist Louis Choris, Kotzebue set out from Kronstadt on July 30, 1815 to find a passage across the Arctic Ocean and explore the less-known parts of Oceania.

Proceeding via Cape Horn in January 1816, he visited the Chilean coast and arrived at Easter Island on March 29, 1816. From there he sailed west and reached the Tuamotu Archipelago around April 16 where he sighted several islands, some of which he named: Doubtful, so named because he thought it might be the Dog Island (Pukapuka); Romanzoff (Tikei); Spiridoff; the Palliser Islands discovered by Cook; Rurick's chain (Arutua); and Krusenstern (Tikahau). He reached Penrhyn atoll on May 1 and was greeted by the natives who came out in canoes. After leaving Polynesia, Kotzebue came upon the Radak and Ralik chains of the Marshall Islands in Micronesia.

Kotzebue then headed north for the Kamchatka Peninsula where he anchored at the harbor of St. Peter and St. Paul on June 18. From there he explored Bering Strait and the coast of Alaska. A sound north of Bering Strait was named Kotzebue Sound. In September he sailed south to California.

Returning by the coast of Asia, he again sailed to the south, sojourned for three weeks at the Sandwich Islands during the Schäffer affair, an attempt by the Russian-American Company to seize Kauai. On January 1, 1817, Kotzebue discovered New Year Island. After further cruising in the Pacific Ocean, he proceeded north. Severe illness compelled him to return to Europe, and he reached the Neva River in Russia on August 3, 1818, bringing home a large collection of previously unknown plants and new ethnological information.

== Second voyage, 1823 to 1826 ==
In 1823 Kotzebue, now a captain, was entrusted with the command of an expedition of two ships of war, the main object of which was to take reinforcements to Kamchatka and patrol the northwest American coast to protect Russian settlements from the smuggling by foreign traders. A staff of scientists on board the Russian sailing sloop Enterprise collected much valuable information and material in geography, ethnography and natural history. Naturalist Eschscholtz again accompanied Kotzebue along with geologist Ernst Reinhold von Hofmann, astronomer Ernst Wilhelm Preuss and physicist Emil Lenz.

The expedition left Kronstadt on July 28, 1823, and rounded Cape Horn on December 23. Kotzebue visited Chile and then sailed west through the Tuamotu Archipelago on the way to Tahiti. The expedition reached Matavai Bay, Tahiti, on March 14. Kotzebue met various members of the London Missionary Society before leaving the island on March 24.

Kotzebue reached Petropavlovsk in July 1824. That same year he visited Mission Santa Clara and noted the conditions of the monjerío. Many positions along the coast were rectified, the Navigator islands visited, and several discoveries made. The expedition returned by the Marianas, Philippines, New Caledonia and the Hawaiian Islands, reaching Kronstadt on July 10, 1826.

When he returned, Kotzebue was promoted to command of the fleet squadron at Kronshtadt, but he left the service in 1830 because of failing health. Kotzebue spent the last years of his life at his Triigi Manor near Kose. He died in Reval in 1846.

Both of Kotzebue's narratives: A Voyage of Discovery into the South Sea and Bering’s Straits for the Purpose of exploring a North-East Passage, undertaken in the Years 1815–1818 (3 vols. 1821), and A New Voyage Round the World in the Years 1823–1826 (1830), have been translated into English.

== Legacy and honors ==
- Kotzebue Sound and the city of Kotzebue, Alaska are named after him.
- Kotzebue Street in the Kalamaja area of northern Tallinn in Estonia is named after him and after his father August von Kotzebue, who both lived on the street.
- The butterfly Pachliopta kotzebuea was named after him by Johann Friedrich von Eschscholtz, a botanist aboard the Rurik.

== See also ==
- List of Baltic German explorers

== Bibliography ==
- "Коцебу, Оттон Евстафиевич" . Brockhaus and Efron Encyclopedic Dictionary (in Russian). 1906.
- Beidleman, Richard G. (2006). California's Frontier Naturalists. Berkeley: University of California Press. pp. 48–70. ISBN 978-0-520-92750-6.
- Daum, Andreas W. (2019). "German Naturalists in the Pacific around 1800: Entanglement, Autonomy, and a Transnational Culture of Expertise". In Berghoff, Hartmut (ed.). Explorations and Entanglements: Germans in Pacific Worlds from the Early Modern Period to World War I. Berghahn Books. pp. 79–102.
- Postnikov, Alexey (2007). "von Kotzebue, Otto". The Oxford Companion to World Exploration. Oxford University Press. ISBN 978-0-19-514922-7.
- Te Rangi Hiroa (1953). Explorers of the Pacific: European and American Discoveries in Polynesia (Special Publication 43 ed.). Honolulu, Hawaii: Bishop Museum.
