= NGC 3507 =

Galaxy in the constellation Leo

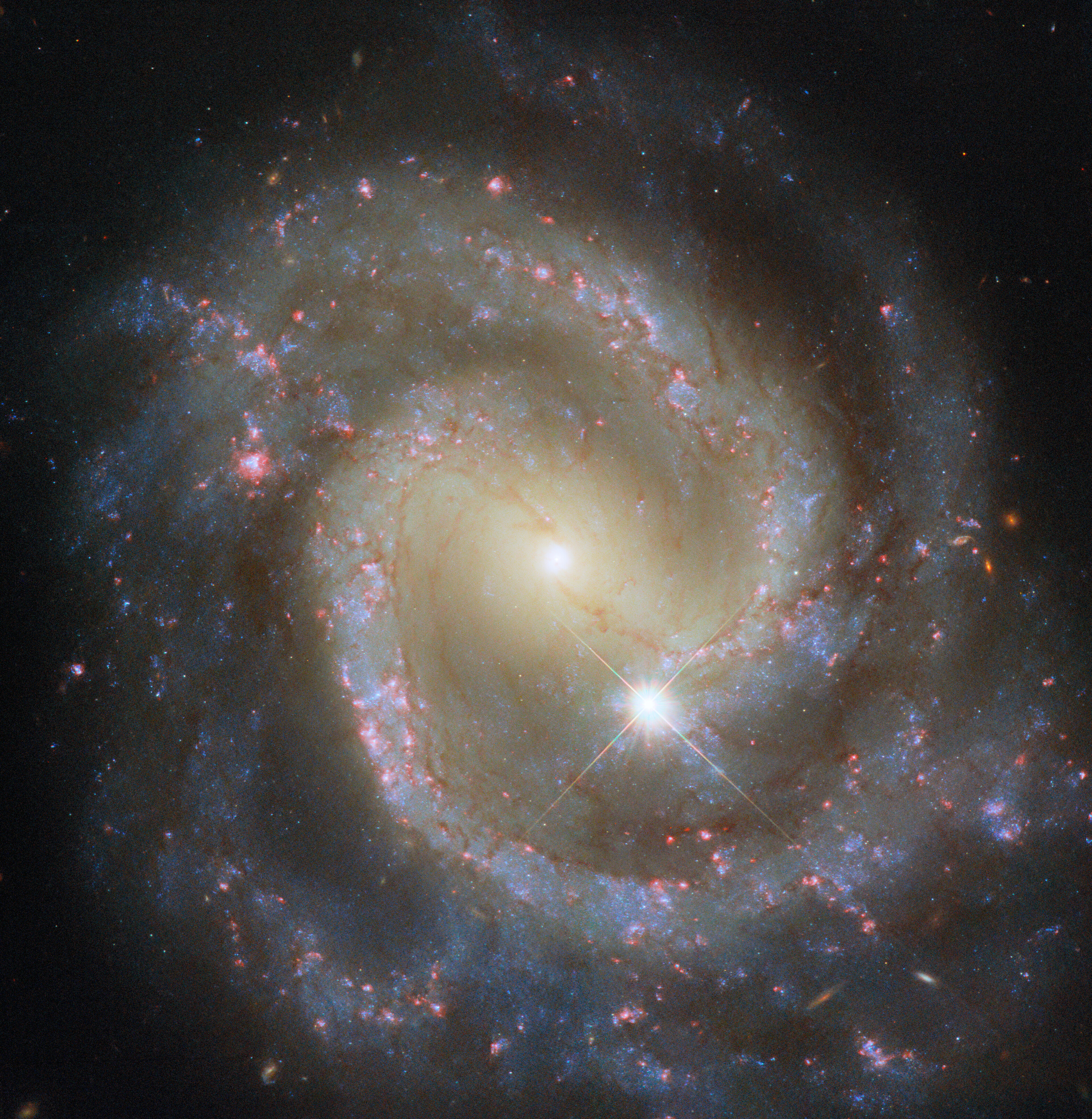
- NGC 3507 imaged by the Hubble Space Telescope. The bright object near center-lower right is a star that has no association with the galaxy.

Observation data (J2000 epoch)
- Constellation: Leo
- Right ascension: 11^{h} 03^{m} 25.3705^{s}
- Declination: +18° 08′ 07.703″
- Redshift: 0.003266 ± 0.000013
- Heliocentric radial velocity: 979 ± 4 km/s
- Distance: 48.9 ± 3.6 Mly (15.0 ± 1.1 Mpc)
- Group or cluster: NGC 3607 Group
- Apparent magnitude (V): 11.9

Characteristics
- Type: SB(s)b
- Size: ~47,000 ly (14.4 kpc) (estimated)
- Apparent size (V): 3.4′ × 2.9′

Other designations
- HOLM 224A, UGC 6123, MCG +03-28-053, PGC 33390, CGCG 095-100

NGC 3507 is a barred spiral galaxy in the constellation Leo. The galaxy lies about 50 million light years away from Earth, which means, given its apparent dimensions, that NGC 3507 is approximately 47,000 light years across. It was discovered by German-British astronomer William Herschel on March 14, 1784.

== Characteristics ==
The galaxy features a prominent bar and two spiral arms emerge from the end of the bar at a right angle. It is considered to be a grand design galaxy, as the two arms are well defined. The arms are bright for about half a revolution and can be traced for nearly a full revolution before fading. The Southeast arm wraps more tightly than the northwest one. The inner regions feature knots, which have been identified as young star groupings. About 90 have been detected, with a mean diameter of 121 pc. The galaxy lacks high-velocity clouds, indicating low star formation rate. The star formation rate is estimated to be 2.0±0.4 M_{☉}. The hydrogen distribution is clumpy and there is a low HI signal from the central region of the galaxy.

The nucleus of the galaxy has been found to be active and has been categorised as a LINER. However its active nucleus status has been questioned, as the ultraviolet radiation and optical spectrum are consistent with the presence of a compact young star cluster in the nucleus and the X-ray emission doesn't follow the power law indicating it could be the result of many supernova remnants creating a superbubble. On the other hand, OIII/ Hα and NII/ Hα ratios are in line with other active galaxies. A radio counterpart of the core which extends slightly to the south has been observed, indicating the galaxy may have a jet.

The galaxy is seen nearly face-on, at an inclination of 17°.

The bright star near the center of the galaxy is a spectroscopic binary, catalogued as BD+18 2441.

== Nearby galaxies ==
NGC 3507 forms a pair with NGC 3501, which lies 12.7 arcminutes away. Together, the two galaxies are listed as Holm 224 in Erik Holmberg's A Study of Double and Multiple Galaxies Together with Inquiries into some General Metagalactic Problems, published in 1937. A. M. Garcia puts the galaxy in the same group as UGC 6095, UGC 617, UGC 6112, and UGC 6181. On the other hand, Makarov considers NGC 3507 to be a member of the NGC 3607 Group, along with NGC 3443, NGC 3447, NGC 3455, NGC 3457, NGC 3501, NGC 3599, NGC 3605, NGC 3607, and NGC 3608.

== Gallery ==
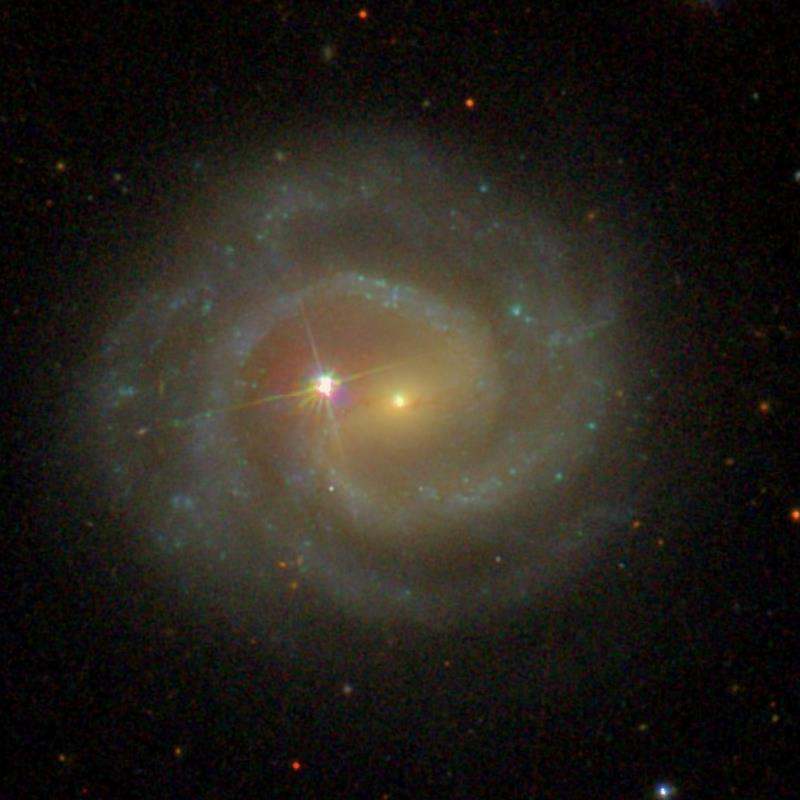
NGC 3507 imaged by Sloan Digital Sky Survey

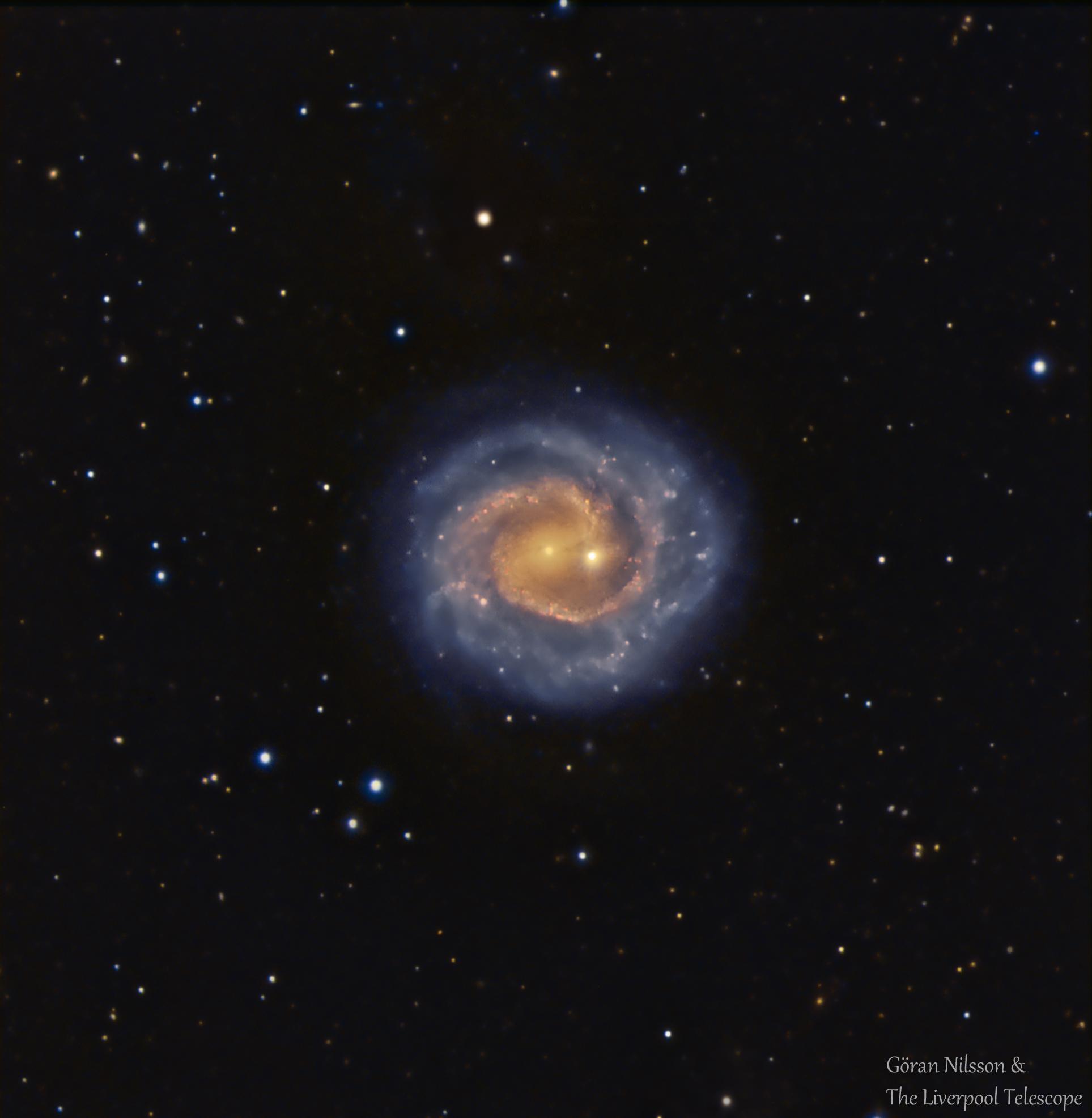
NGC 3507 by the Liverpool Telescope

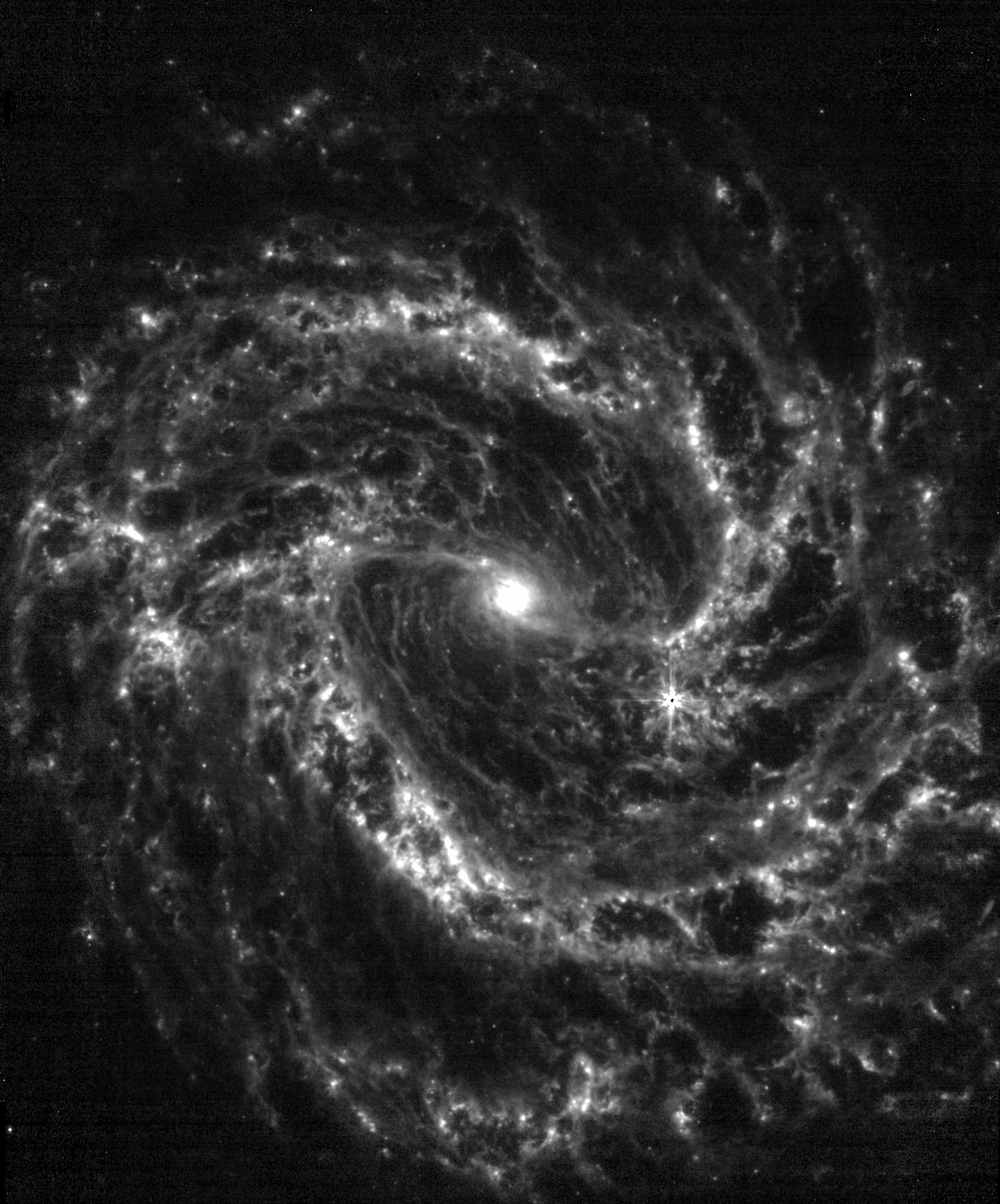
NGC 3507 imaged in mid infrared by the James Webb Space Telescope

== See also ==
- List of NGC objects (3001–4000)
