= 716 Berkeley =

Background asteroid

Discovery
- Discovered by: J. Palisa
- Discovery site: Vienna Obs.
- Discovery date: 30 July 1911

Designations
- Pronunciation: /ˈbɜːrkliː/
- Named after: Berkeley (U.S. City, California)
- Alternative designations: A911 OC · 1947 CH; 1952 FA · A906 OB; 1911 MD
- Minor planet category: main-belt · (middle); background

Orbital characteristics
- Epoch 31 May 2020 (JD 2459000.5)
- Uncertainty parameter 0
- Observation arc: 113.32 yr (41,390 d)
- Aphelion: 3.0557 AU
- Perihelion: 2.5682 AU
- Semi-major axis: 2.8120 AU
- Eccentricity: 0.0867
- Orbital period (sidereal): 4.72 yr (1,722 d)
- Mean anomaly: 136.21°
- Mean motion: 0° 12^{m} 32.4^{s} / day
- Inclination: 8.4872°
- Longitude of ascending node: 145.89°
- Argument of perihelion: 56.811°

Physical characteristics
- Mean diameter: 19.768±0.167 km; 21.28±1.5 km; 21.55±0.57 km
- Synodic rotation period: 15.55±0.04 h (Note: Lightcurve plot of (716) Berkeley. Rotation period 15.577 hours by Joe Garlitz (2009). Quality code is 2+. Summary figures at the LCDB and J. Garlitz (archived) websites.)
- Geometric albedo: 0.1801±0.028; 0.182±0.011; 0.220±0.045
- Spectral type: Tholen = S; SMASS = S; B–V = 0.860±0.068; U–B = 0.351±0.068
- Absolute magnitude (H): 10.7; 10.84

716 Berkeley (prov. designation: A911 OC or 1911 MD) is a background asteroid from the central regions of the asteroid belt. It was discovered by Austrian astronomer Johann Palisa at the Vienna Observatory on 30 July 1911. The stony S-type asteroid has a rotation period of 15.6 hours and measures approximately 21 kilometers (13 miles) in diameter. It was named after the city of Berkeley, California, where the discoverer's colleague Armin Otto Leuschner (1868–1953) was the director of the local observatory.

== Orbit and classification ==
Berkeley is a non-family asteroid of the main belt's background population when applying the hierarchical clustering method to its proper orbital elements. It orbits the Sun in the central asteroid belt at a distance of 2.6–3.1 AU once every 4 years and 9 months (1,722 days; semi-major axis of 2.81 AU). Its orbit has an eccentricity of 0.09 and an inclination of 8° with respect to the ecliptic. The body's observation arc begins with its first observation at Heidelberg on 16 July 1906, five years prior to its official discovery observation by Johann Palisa at Vienna.

== Naming ==
According to Alexander Schnell, this minor planet was named by the discoverer after the U.S. city of Berkeley in California, where American astronomer and colleague Armin Otto Leuschner (1868–1953) was a long-time director at the Leuschner Observatory (then called Students' Observatory). Known for his books Celestial Mechanics and The Minor Planets of the Hecuba Group, Leuschner worked on the orbit determination of 719 Albert, which was originally discovered by Palisa in 1911 but remained a lost asteroid until 2000. The naming citation was not mentioned in The Names of the Minor Planets by Paul Herget in 1955. Palisa also named asteroid 718 Erida after Leuschner's daughter. The lunar crater Leuschner and asteroid 1361 Leuschneria, discovered by Eugène Delporte in 1935, were later named directly after the American astronomer.

== Physical characteristics ==
In both the Tholen and SMASS classification, Berkeley is a common, stony S-type asteroid. It is also an S-type in the Bus–DeMeo classification, while in the Tholen- and SMASS-like taxonomic variants of the Small Solar System Objects Spectroscopic Survey (S3OS2), this asteroid is a K-type and Sq-subtype which transitions to the uncommon Q-type, respectively.

=== Rotation period ===
In May 2009, a rotational lightcurve of Berkeley was obtained from photometric observations by American amateur astronomer Joe Garlitz at his Elgin Observatory in Oregon. Lightcurve analysis gave a rotation period of 15.55±0.04 hours with a brightness variation of 0.25±0.03 magnitude (U=2+). Lower rated lightcurves obtained by Claes-Ingvar Lagerkvist in 1977, and by David Romeuf in 2018, gave a divergent period of larger than 17 h and 34.3±0.6 h with an amplitude of larger than 0.2 and 0.25±0.02 magnitude, respectively (U=1/2).

=== Diameter and albedo ===
According to the surveys carried out by the NEOWISE mission of NASA's Wide-field Infrared Survey Explorer (WISE), the Infrared Astronomical Satellite IRAS, and the Japanese Akari satellite, Berkeley measures (19.768±0.167), (21.28±1.5) and (21.55±0.57) kilometers in diameter and its surface has an albedo of (0.220±0.045), (0.1801±0.028) and (0.182±0.011), respectively.

The Collaborative Asteroid Lightcurve Link derives an albedo of 0.2027 and a diameter of 21.38 kilometers based on an absolute magnitude of 10.7. Alternative mean-diameters published by the WISE team include (21.519±0.054 km) and (21.89±0.78 km) with a corresponding albedo of (0.1808±0.0518) and (0.170±0.017).
