= Leuschner =

Leuschner may refer to:

- Leuschner Observatory
- Leuschner (crater)

People with the surname "Leuschner"

- Armin Otto Leuschner, American astronomer and educator (1868–1953)
- Friedrich Ludwig Leuschner, Politician in the Kingdom of Saxony
- Katerina Von Leuschner
- Lisa Leuschner
- Michael Leuschner
- Robert Lee "Skip" Leuschner Jr., Rear admiral, U.S. Navy (b. 1935)
- Wilhelm Leuschner
- William Leuschner
