= Erida =

Erida may refer to:

- 718 Erida, minor planet orbiting the Sun named for Erida Leuschner, daughter of astronomer Armin Otto Leuschner
- Erida (goddess), alternative name for Eris in mythology – noted as the goddess of Hate in the Iliad
- Erida (name), list of feminine given names
- Erida (film), a 2021 Indian Malayalam-language film by V. K. Prakash
