= NGC 3443 =

Galaxy in the constellation Leo)

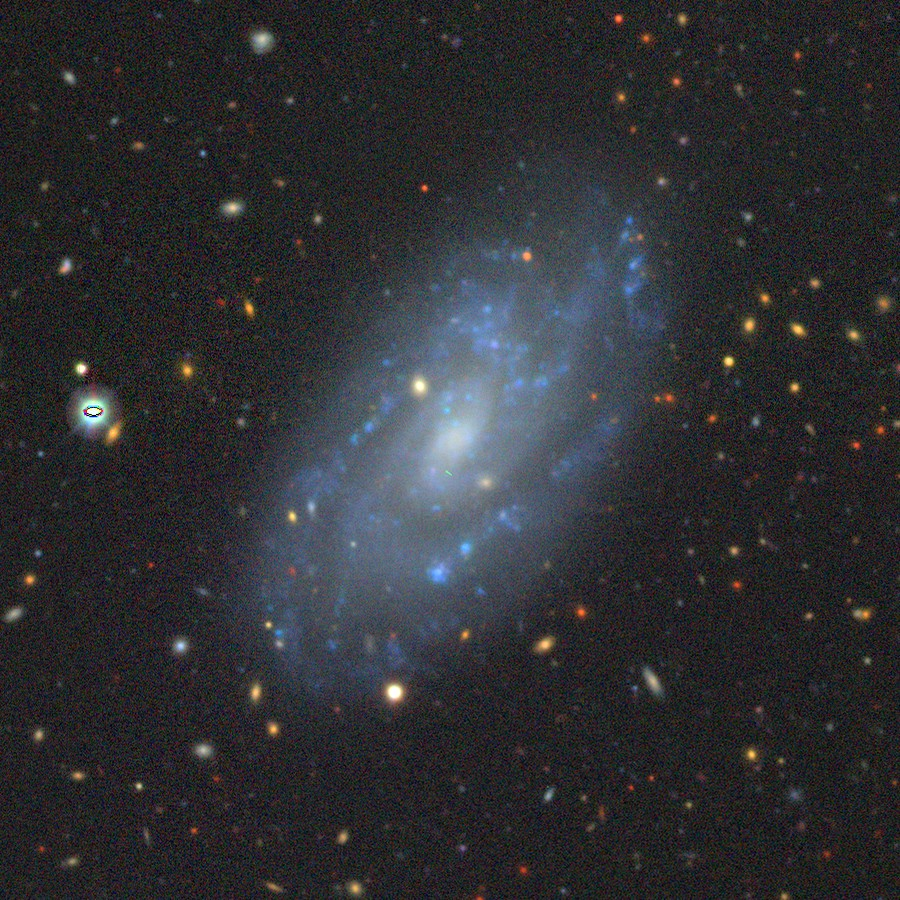
- NGC 3443 imaged by Legacy Surveys

Observation data (J2000 epoch)
- Constellation: Leo
- Right ascension: 10^{h} 53^{m} 00.1481^{s}
- Declination: +17° 34′ 26.497″
- Redshift: 0.003776
- Heliocentric radial velocity: 1132 ± 1 km/s
- Distance: 70.6 ± 5.1 Mly (21.66 ± 1.56 Mpc)
- Apparent magnitude (V): 13.1

Characteristics
- Type: SAd
- Size: ~68,000 ly (20.8 kpc) (estimated)
- Apparent size (V): 2.8′ × 1.4′

Other designations
- 2MASX J10530011+1734250, UGC 6000, MCG +03-28-025, PGC 32671, CGCG 095-056

NGC 3443 is a spiral galaxy in the constellation of Leo. Its velocity with respect to the cosmic microwave background is 1468 ± 24 km/s, which corresponds to a Hubble distance of 21.66 ± 1.56 Mpc (~70.6 million light-years). It was discovered by American astronomer Lewis Swift on April 24, 1887.

One supernova has been observed in NGC 3443: SN 2024ehs (Type II, mag. 18.098) was discovered by ATLAS on March 15, 2024.

== NGC 3370 Group ==
According to A.M. Garcia, the galaxy NGC 3443 is a member of the NGC 3370 group (also known as LGG 219) that includes NGC 3370, NGC 3454, NGC 3455, and UGC 5945.

== See also ==
- List of NGC objects (3001–4000)
