= NGC 4526 =

Lenticular galaxy in the constellation Virgo

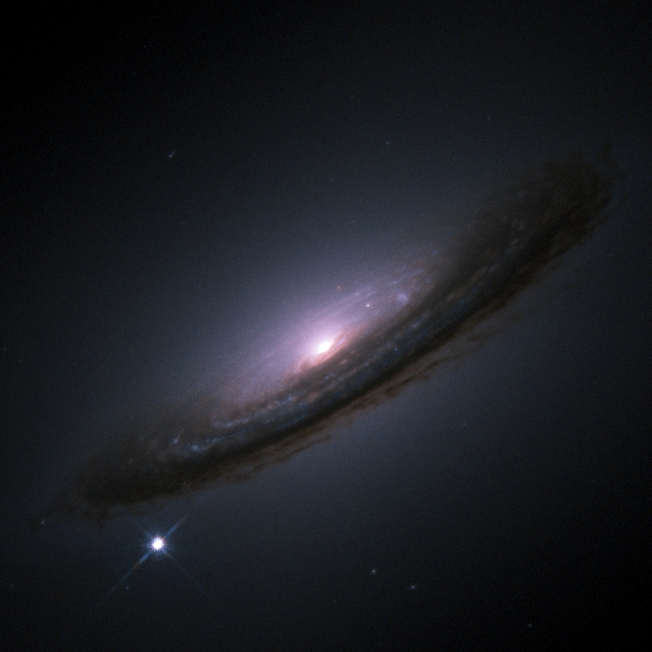
- Supernova SN 1994D (lower left) in the outskirts of NGC 4526's central disk

Observation data (J2000 epoch)
- Constellation: Virgo
- Right ascension: 12^{h} 34^{m} 03.029^{s}
- Declination: +07° 41′ 56.90″
- Redshift: 0.002058±0.000017
- Heliocentric radial velocity: 617±5 km/s
- Distance: 55 ± 5 Mly (16.9 ± 1.5 Mpc); 52 Mly (15.8 Mpc)
- Apparent magnitude (V): 9.6

Characteristics
- Type: SAB(s)0°
- Size: ~114,400 ly (35.07 kpc) (estimated)
- Apparent size (V): 7.0′ × 2.5′

Other designations
- IRAS 12315+0758, NGC 4560, UGC 7718, MCG +01-32-100, PGC 41772, CGCG 042-155

NGC 4526 is a barred lenticular galaxy with an embedded dusty disc in the constellation of Virgo. Alternatively, it is listed as NGC 4560 and commonly known as the Hairy Eyebrow Galaxy. It was discovered on 13 April 1784 by William Herschel. Herschel observed it again on 28 December 1785, resulting in the galaxy being entered twice into the New General Catalogue. The galaxy is located approximately 55 million light-years from the Milky Way.

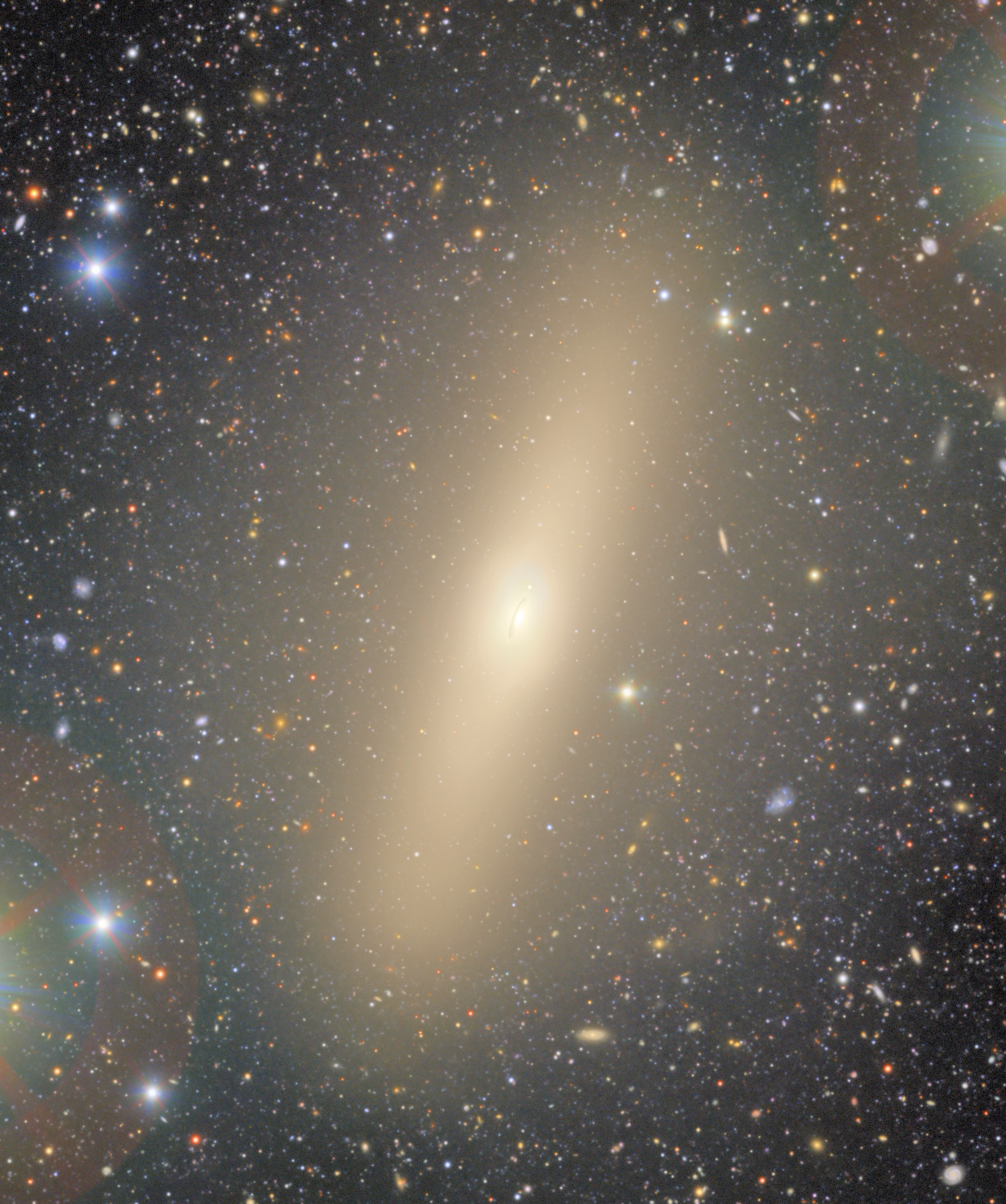
NGC 4526 imaged by the Vera C. Rubin Observatory

The galaxy is seen nearly edge-on. The morphological classification is SAB(s)0°, which indicates a lenticular structure with a weak bar across the center and pure spiral arms without a ring. It belongs to the Virgo Cluster and is one of the brightest known lenticular galaxies. In the galaxy's outer halo, globular cluster orbital velocities indicate abnormal poverty of dark matter: only 43±18% of the mass within 5 effective radii.

The inner nucleus of this galaxy displays a rise in stellar orbital motion that indicates the presence of a central dark mass. The best fit model for the motion of molecular gas in the core region suggests there is a supermassive black hole with about 4.5+4.2
−3.0×10^{8} (450 million) times the mass of the Sun. This is the first object to have its black-hole mass estimated by measuring the rotation of gas molecules around its centre with an astronomical interferometer (in this case the Combined Array for Research in Millimeter-wave Astronomy).

== Supernovae ==
Two supernovae have been observed in NGC 4526:

- SN 1969E (type unknown, mag. 16) was discovered by Enrique Chavira on 23 March 1969.
- SN 1994D (Type Ia, mag. 15.2) was discovered independently by the Leuschner Observatory Supernova Search and by Dr. M. Richmond, on 7 March 1994, about two weeks before reaching peak brightness. It was caused by the explosion of a white dwarf star composed of carbon and oxygen.

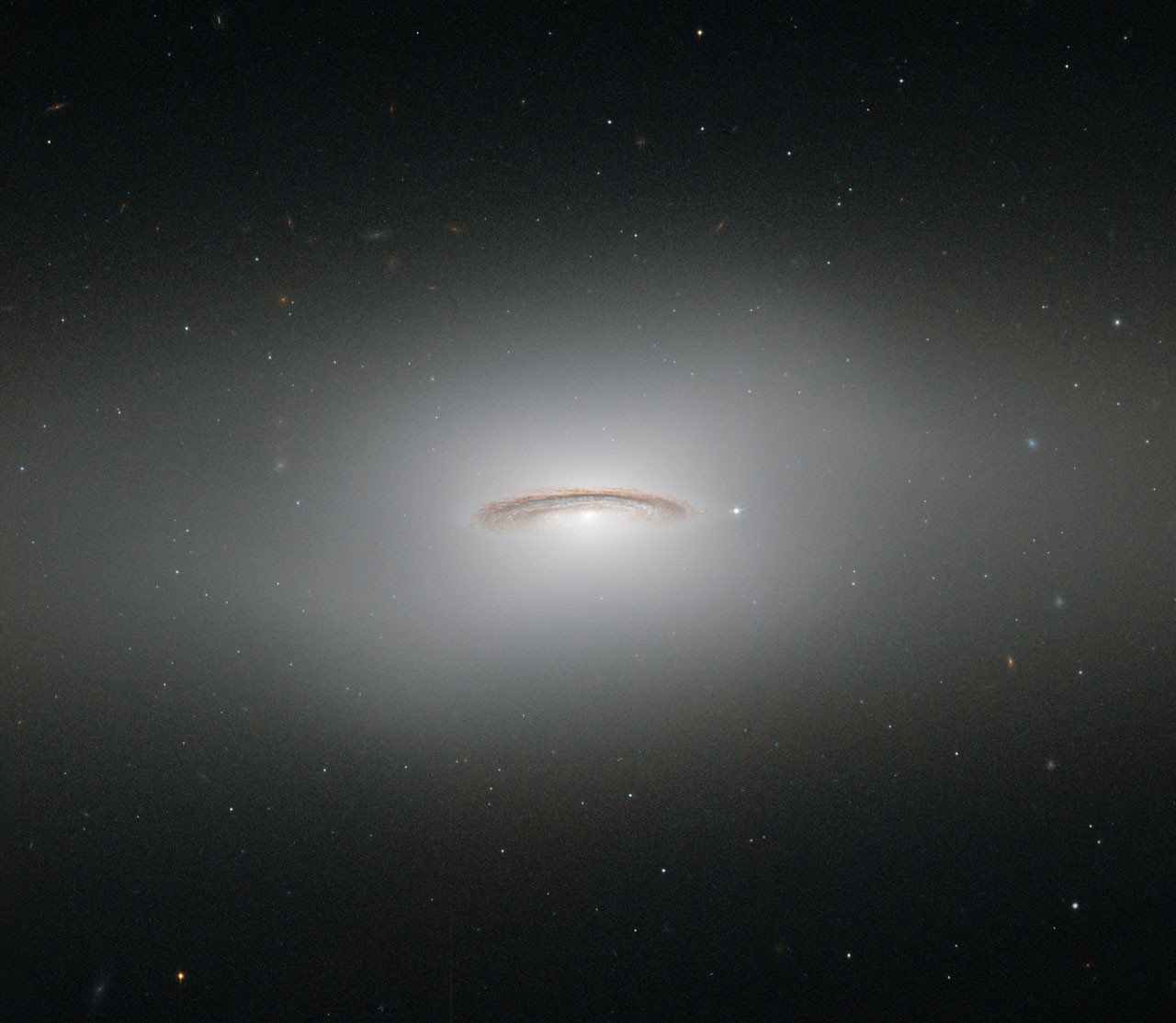
Wider Hubble Space Telescope image showing the envelope of more distant orbiting stars

== See also ==
- Black Eye Galaxy
- List of NGC objects (1–1000)
