= Erida (name) =

Erida or Érida is a feminine given name. The "Érida" spelling is popular in Spanish-speaking cultures.

Those bearing it include:

- Erida Leuschner (fl. 1910s), daughter of astronomer Armin Otto Leuschner & namesake of asteroid 718 Erida
- Erida Luka (fl. 2000s), president of World Ecological Parties
- Erida (goddess), Greek goddess of Hate and sister of Ares in the Iliad
