= NGC 3370 =

Galaxy in the constellation Leo

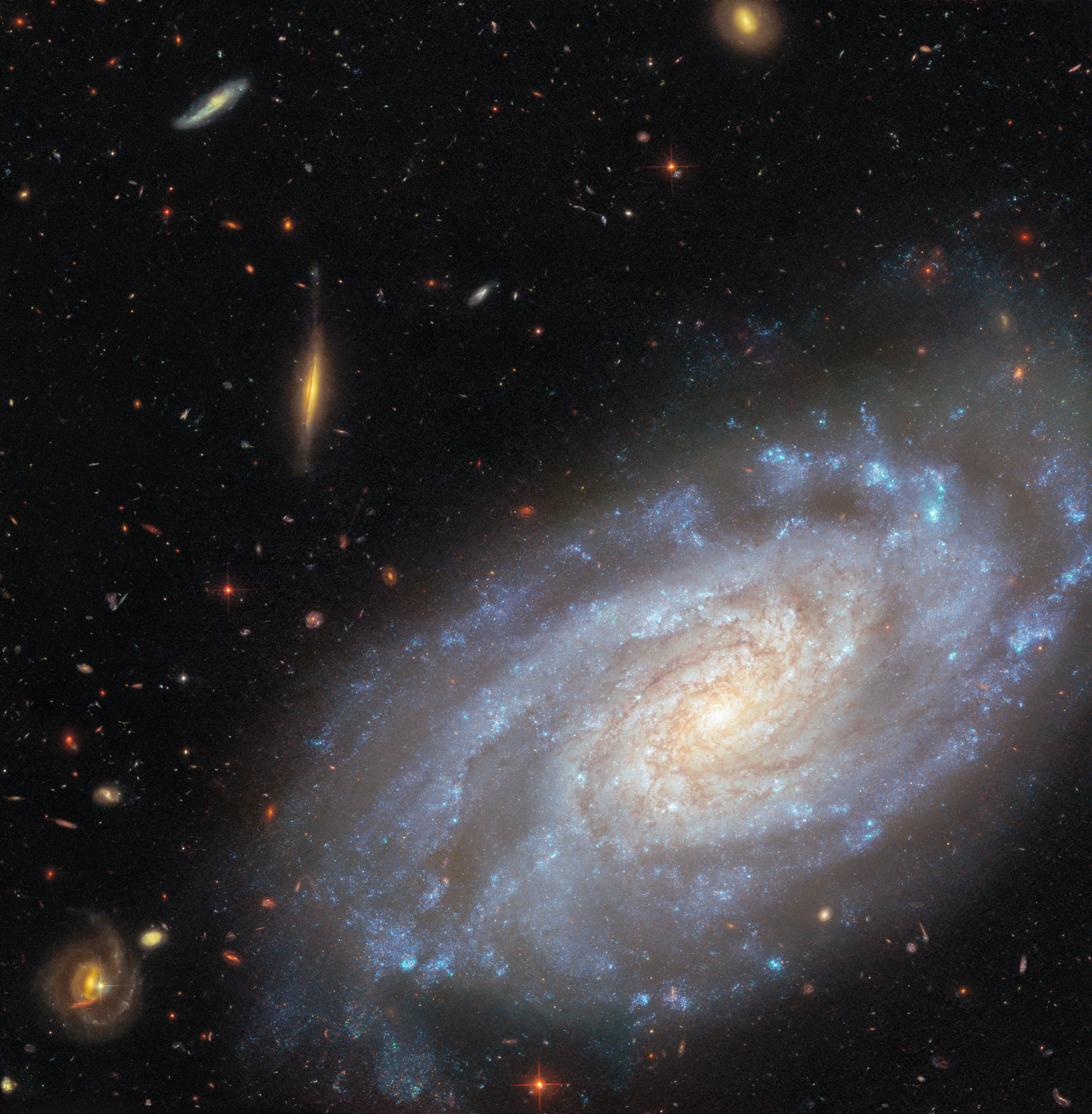
- NGC 3370 imaged by the Hubble Space Telescope

Observation data (J2000 epoch)
- Constellation: Leo
- Right ascension: 10^{h} 47^{m} 04.0832^{s}
- Declination: +17° 16′ 25.603″
- Heliocentric radial velocity: 1279 ± 4 km/s
- Distance: 78 Mly (23.91 Mpc)h^{−1}_{0.6774} (Light-travel)
- Group or cluster: NGC 3370 Group
- Apparent magnitude (V): 12.3

Characteristics
- Type: SA(s)c III
- Size: 49,930 to 77,270 ly (15.31 to 23.69 kpc) (diameter; 2MASS K-band total and D_{25.0} B-band isophotes)
- Apparent size (V): 3.2′ × 1.8′
- Notable features: Dusty

Other designations
- Silverado Galaxy, IRAS 10444+1732, UGC 5887, MCG +03-28-008, PGC 32207, CGCG 095-019

NGC 3370 (also known as UGC 5887 or Silverado Galaxy) is a spiral galaxy about 82.2 ± 5.9 million light-years (25.2 ± 1.8 megaparsecs) away in the constellation Leo. It is nearly comparable to our Milky Way both in diameter with a D_{25} isophotal size about 77,300 ly (23.69 kpc) comparing to the Milky Way Galaxy's 87,400 ly (26.8 kpc) diameter, and as well as in mass (10^{11} M_{☉}). NGC 3370 exhibits an intricate spiral arm structure surrounding a poorly defined nucleus. It is a member of the NGC 3370 Group of galaxies, which is a member of the Leo II Groups, a series of galaxies and galaxy clusters strung out from the right edge of the Virgo Supercluster.

== History ==
NGC 3370 was discovered by William Herschel on 21 March 1784, who provided it with the designation II 81. His son John later designated it 750. William Herschel cataloged I 80 to NGC 3348 before and II 82 to NGC 3455 after NGC 3370.

The object has a surface brightness of 13 and a position angle (PA) of 140°.

== Supernova ==
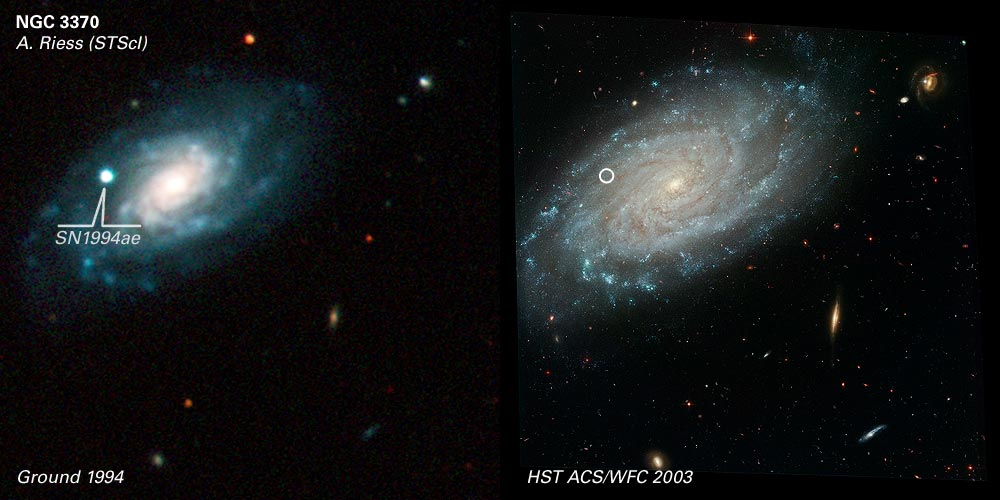
The image on the left, taken in 1994, shows SN 1994ae. It was not visible in 2003 when the Hubble Space Telescope imaged the galaxy.

On November 14, 1994, Schuyler D. Van Dyk and the Leuschner Observatory Supernova Search discovered a supernova in NGC 3370 at 10^{h} 44^{m} 21.52^{s} +17° 32′ 20.7″, designated SN 1994ae. It was a Type Ia supernova, and one of the nearest and best observed since the advent of modern digital detectors. The maximal light of the supernova was estimated to have occurred between November 30 and December 1, peaking at visual magnitude 13.

== Image gallery ==
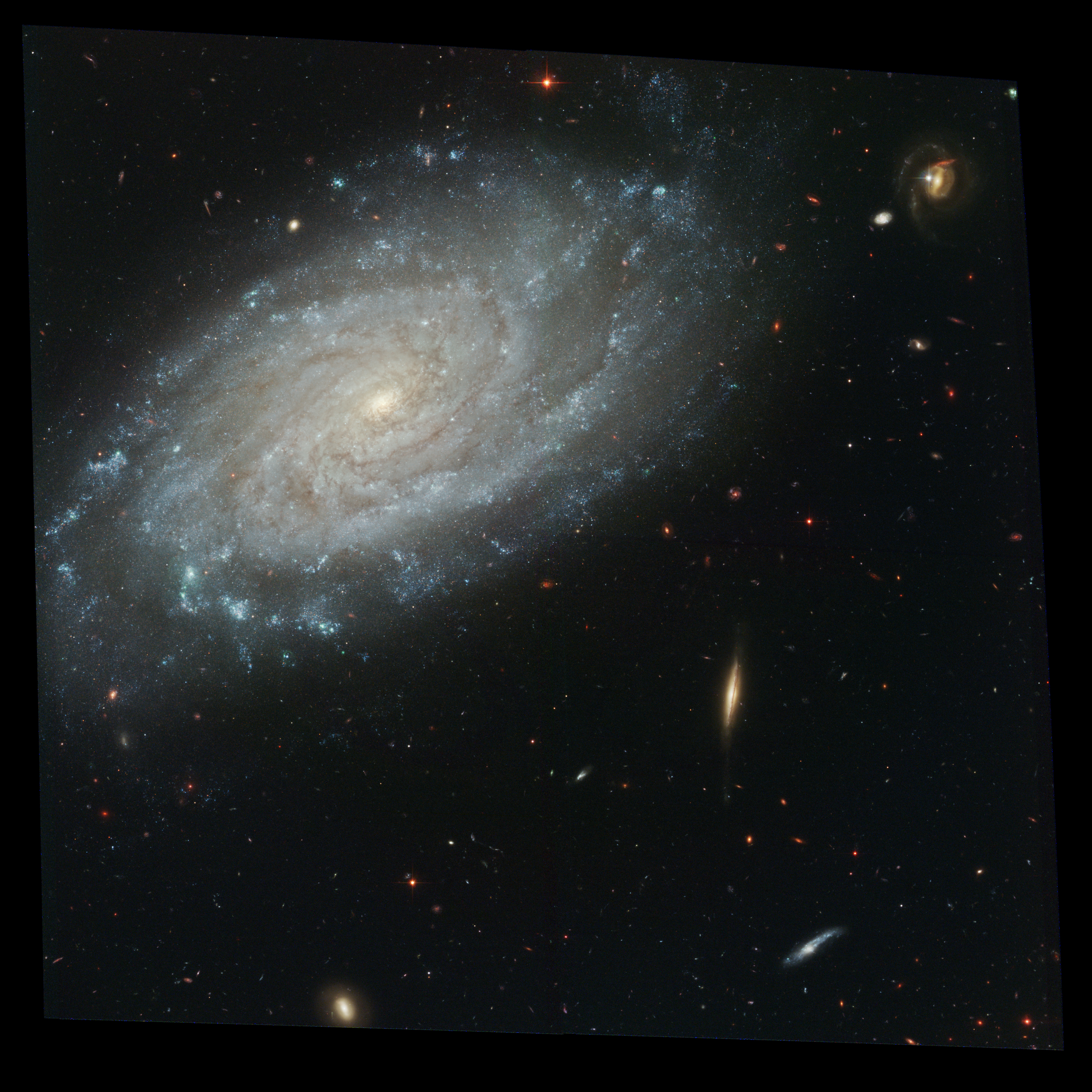
NGC 3370 imaged by the Hubble Space Telescope.
Credit: NASA/ESA

== See also ==
- NGC 1365, spiral galaxy
- List of NGC objects (3001–4000)
