= SN 1994D =

Type Ia supernova in Virgo

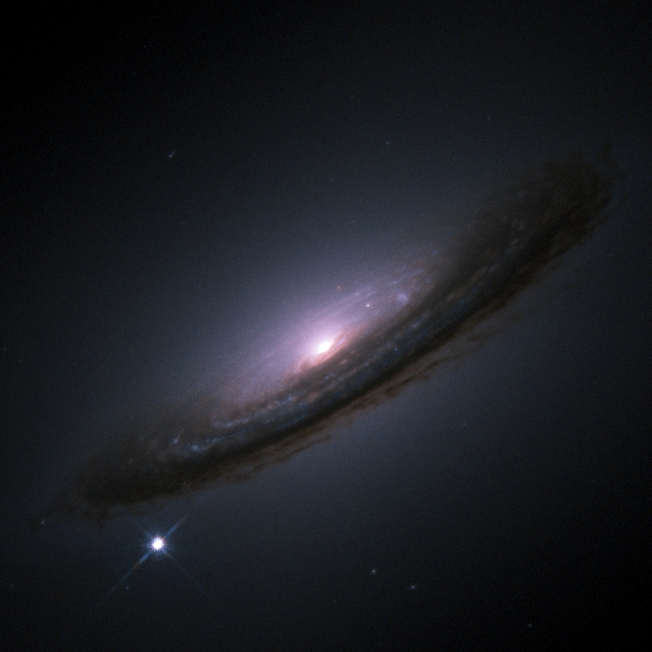
- Hubble Space Telescope image of SN 1994D, visible at lower left
- Event type: Supernova
- Type Ia
- Date: 7 March 1994 by R. Treffers
- Instrument: Leuschner Observatory
- Constellation: Virgo
- Right ascension: 12^{h} 34^{m} 02.395^{s}
- Declination: +07° 42′ 05.70″
- Epoch: B2000.0
- Distance: ~55.15 million ly
- Redshift: 0.0036, 0.0001, −0.0001, 0.0021, 0.0023, 0.0022, 0.0008, 0.0005, 0.0013, 0.0017, 0.0004, 0.0024, 0.0011, 0.0012, 0.0002
- Host: NGC 4526
- Progenitor type: White dwarf
- Peak apparent magnitude: +11.9
- Other designations: SN 1994D, AAVSO 1229+08
- Preceded by: SN 1994C
- Followed by: SN 1994E
- Related media on Commons

SN 1994D was a Type Ia supernova event on the outskirts of galaxy NGC 4526, which was discovered on 7 March 1994.

== Observation ==
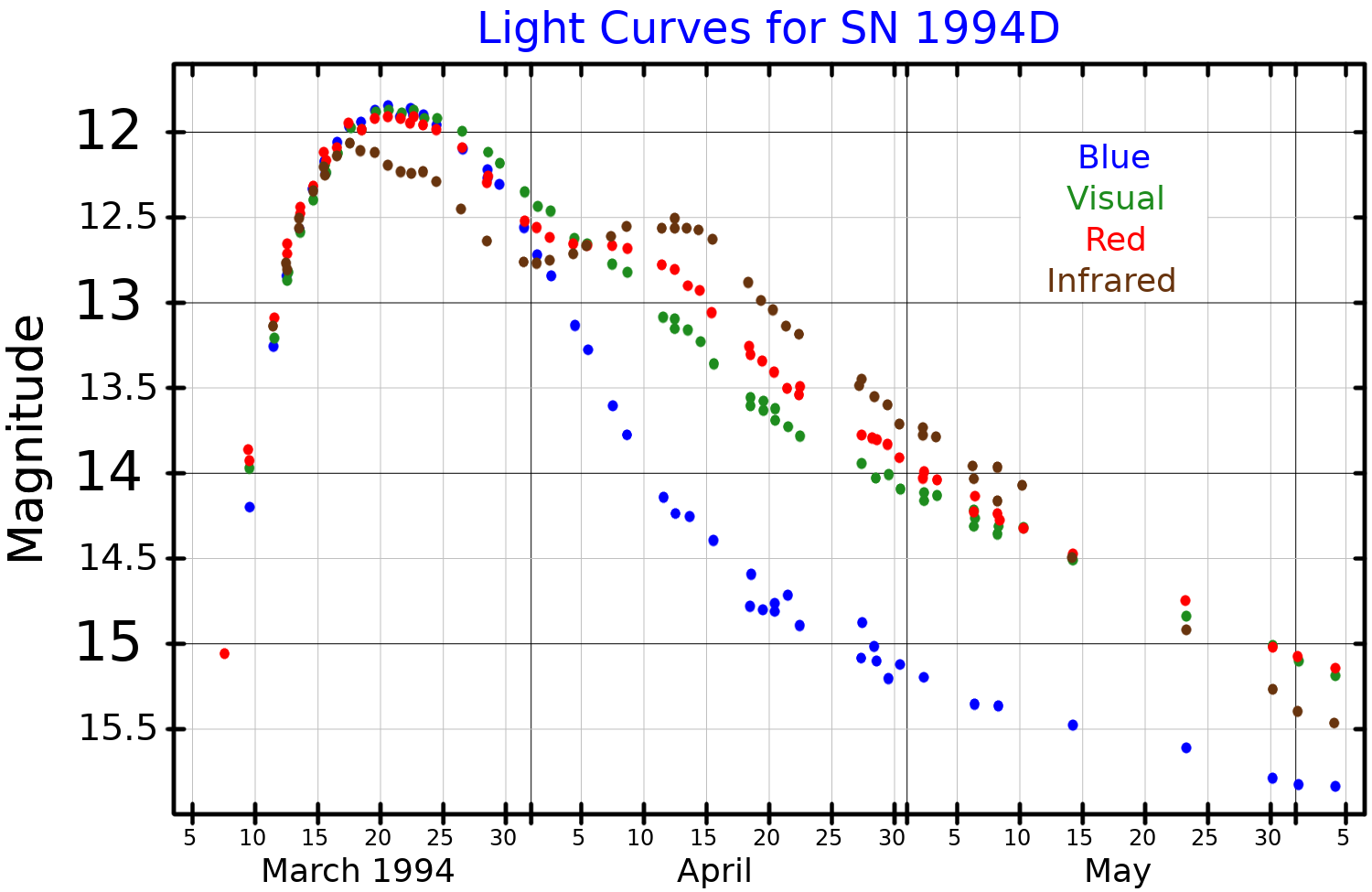
Light curves in four photometric bands for SN 1994D, adapted from Richmond et al. (1995)

It was offset by 9.0″ west and 7.8″ south of the galaxy center and positioned near a prominent dust lane. It was caused by the explosion of a white dwarf star composed of carbon and oxygen. The event was discovered on 7 March 1994 by R. R. Treffers and associates using the automated 30-inch telescope at Leuschner Observatory. It reached peak visual brightness, magnitude 11.9, two weeks later on March 22. Modelling of the light curve indicates the explosion would have been visible around March 3–4. A possible detection of helium in the spectrum was made by W. P. S. Meikle and associates in 1996. A mass of 0.014 to 0.03 M_{☉} in helium would be needed to produce this feature.

== See also ==
- History of supernova observation
