= NGC 3447 =

Barred Magellanic spiral galaxy in the constellation Leo

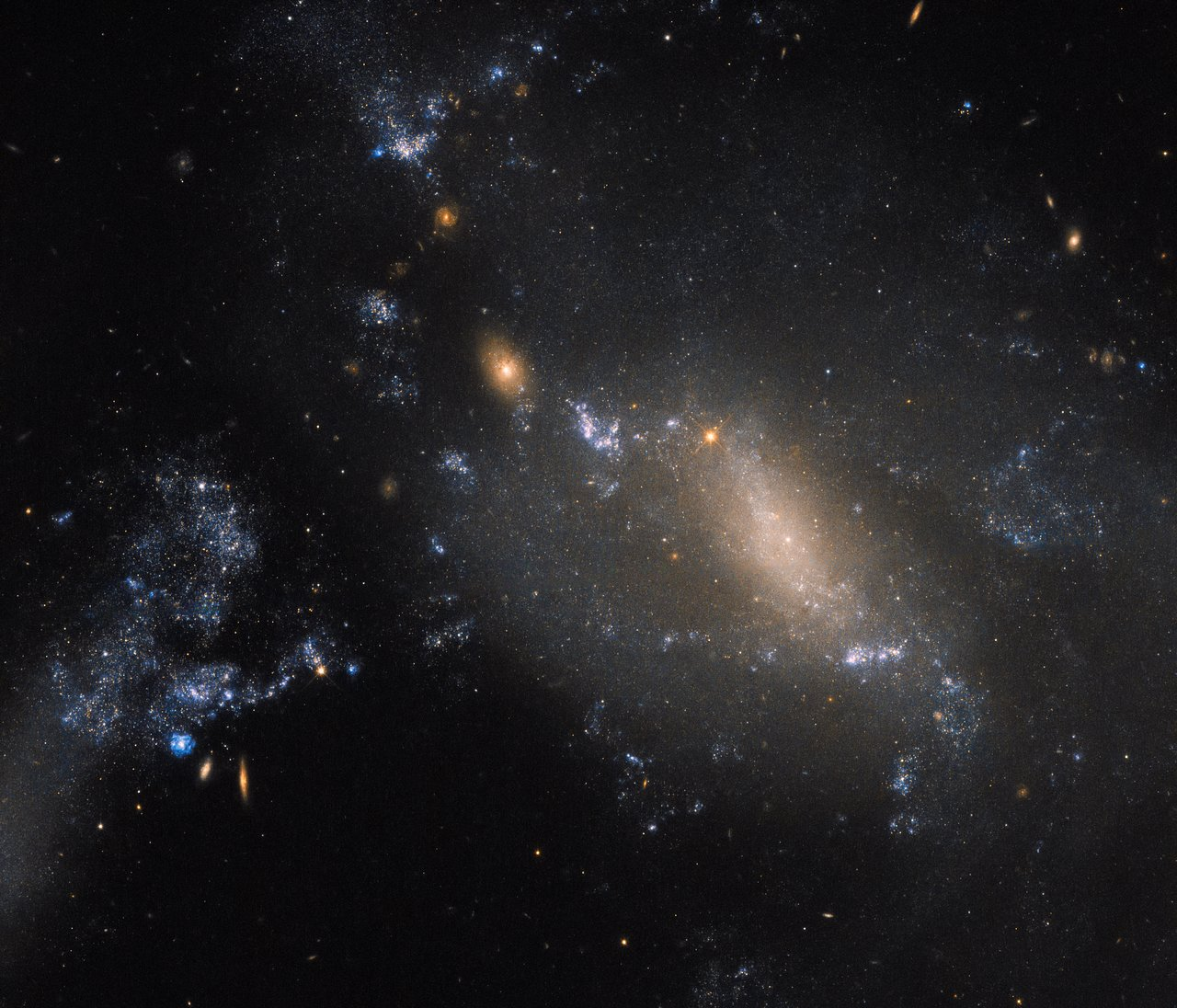
- NGC 3447 (center-right), as seen by the Hubble Space Telescope. UGC 6007 can be seen on the left.

Observation data (J2000 epoch)
- Constellation: Leo
- Right ascension: 10h 53m 24s
- Declination: +16° 46′ 20″
- Redshift: 0.003559
- Distance: 70 Mly (21.4 Mpc)
- Apparent magnitude (B): 14.3
- Surface brightness: 25.37 mag/arcsec^2 (3447) and 24.38 mag/arcsec^2 (3447A)

Characteristics
- Type: SAm (3447) and Im (3447A)

Other designations
- PGC 32694/32700, UGC 6006/6007, VV 252, IRAS 10507+1702, CGCG 095-058, KPG 255

NGC 3447 is a barred Magellanic spiral galaxy located in the constellation Leo. Its speed relative to the cosmic microwave background is 1,405 ± 34 km/s, which corresponds to a Hubble distance of 20.7 ± 1.5 Mpc (~67.5 million ly). It was discovered by the British astronomer John Herschel in 1836.

NGC 3447 shows a broad HI line.

With a surface brightness equal to 15.61 mag/am^2, NGC 3443 is classified as a low surface brightness galaxy (LSB). LSB galaxies are diffuse galaxies with a surface brightness less than one magnitude lower than that of the ambient night sky.

To date, four non-redshift measurements yield a distance of 13.730 ± 9.802 Mpc (~44.8 million ly), which is slightly outside the range values of Hubble.

== NGC 3447A ==
NGC 3447A, also known as UGC 6007, is an irregular galaxy in contact with NGC 3447. It has roughly the same apparent magnitude, and has a slightly lower surface brightness. Due to gravitational forces, it has become distorted, showing disrupted spiral arms and remnants of its spiral structure, hinting it might have been a spiral galaxy in the past.

== Supernova ==
The supernova SN 2012ht (Type Ia, mag. 18.6) was discovered in NGC 3447 by Koichi Nishiyama and Fujio Kabashima on December 18, 2012.

== NGC 3447 group ==
NGC 3447 is the largest galaxy in a group of galaxies named after it. The NGC 3447 group includes at least 4 other galaxies: NGC 3447A, NGC 3457, UGC 6022 and UGC 6035.

== See also ==
- List of NGC objects (3001–4000)
- List of spiral galaxies
