= NGC 3501 =

Spiral galaxy in the constellation Leo

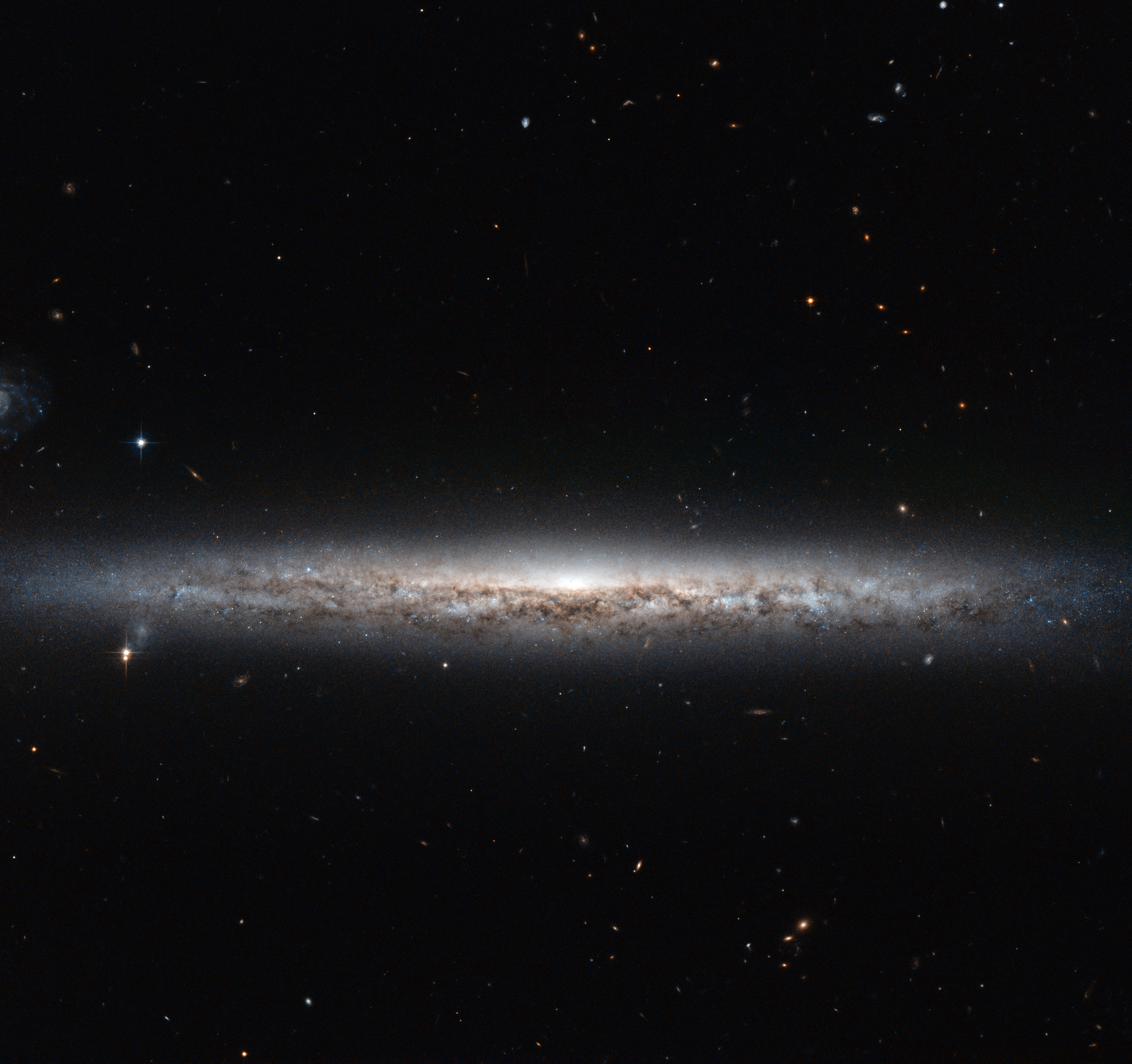
- NGC 3501 imaged by the Hubble Space Telescope

Observation data (J2000 epoch)
- Constellation: Leo
- Right ascension: 11^{h} 02^{m} 47.307^{s}
- Declination: +17° 59′ 22.31″
- Redshift: 0.003769
- Heliocentric radial velocity: 1130
- Distance: 77.02 ± 6.06 Mly (23.615 ± 1.857 Mpc)
- Apparent magnitude (B): 13.8

Characteristics
- Type: Scd:
- Mass: 1.5×10^{10} M_{☉}
- Size: 89,600 ly (27,480 pc)
- Apparent size (V): 4.4′ × 0.56′

Other designations
- HOLM 224B, UGC 6116, MCG +03-28-051, PGC 33343, CGCG 095-097

NGC 3501 is an edge-on spiral galaxy 80 million light years away, located in the constellation Leo. It was discovered on 23 April 1881 by French astronomer Édouard Stephan. NGC 3501 is a young galaxy, consisting mostly of stars aged between 2 and 8 billion years.

NGC 3501 was imaged by the Hubble Space Telescope in 2014, showing an edge-on spiral galaxy; its companion NGC 3507 is not included in the photograph. It is a member of the NGC 3607 Group of galaxies, which is a member of the Leo II Groups, a series of galaxies and galaxy clusters strung out from the right edge of the Virgo Supercluster.

== Gallery ==
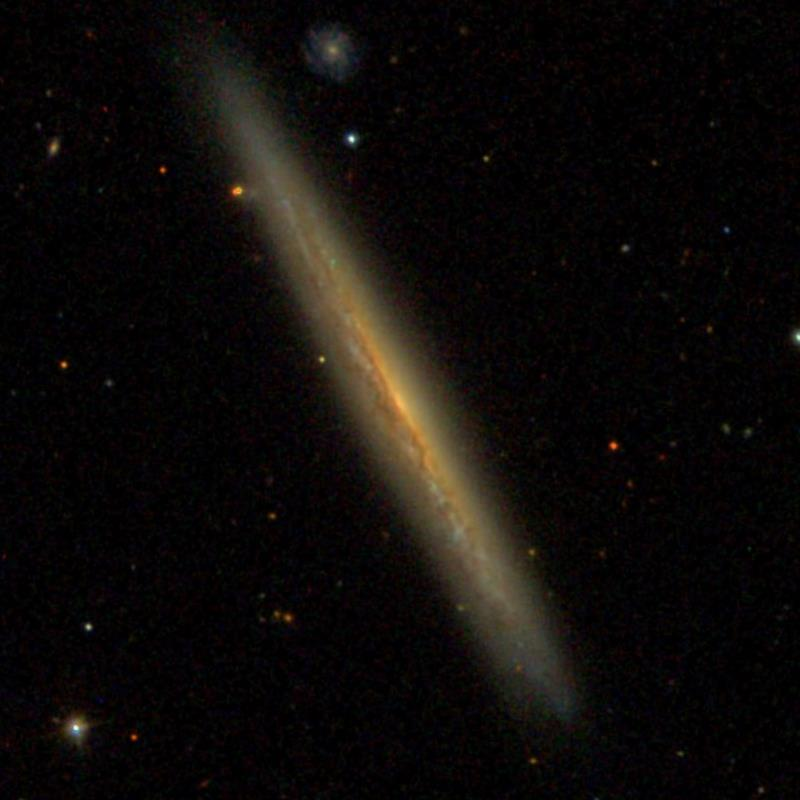
NGC 3501 (SDSS DR14)

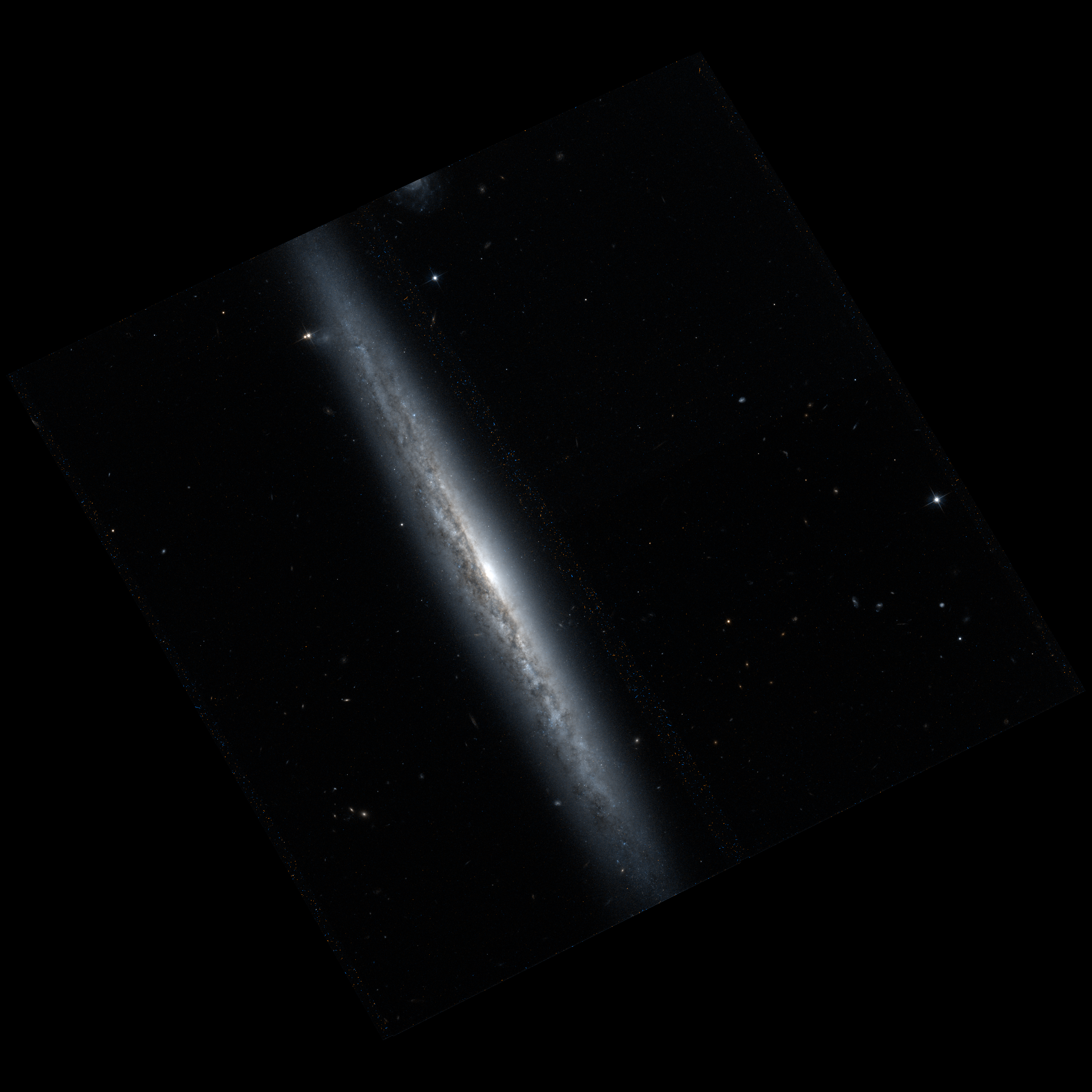
NGC 3501 (HST)

== See also ==
- List of NGC objects (3001–4000)
