= 1361 Leuschneria =

Carbonaceous asteroid

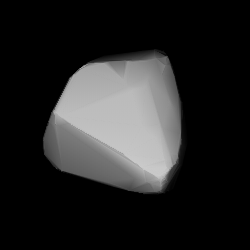
- Modelled shape of Leuschneria

Discovery
- Discovered by: E. Delporte
- Discovery site: Uccle Obs.
- Discovery date: 30 August 1935

Designations
- Named after: Armin Otto Leuschner (American astronomer)
- Alternative designations: 1935 QA
- Minor planet category: main-belt · (outer)

Orbital characteristics
- Epoch 16 February 2017 (JD 2457800.5)
- Uncertainty parameter 0
- Observation arc: 80.95 yr (29,566 days)
- Aphelion: 3.4801 AU
- Perihelion: 2.6841 AU
- Semi-major axis: 3.0821 AU
- Eccentricity: 0.1291
- Orbital period (sidereal): 5.41 yr (1,976 days)
- Mean anomaly: 16.851°
- Mean motion: 0° 10^{m} 55.92^{s} / day
- Inclination: 21.592°
- Longitude of ascending node: 164.73°
- Argument of perihelion: 173.35°

Physical characteristics
- Dimensions: 29.637±0.199 km 30.16 km (derived); 30.301±0.212 km 32.74±0.41 km 33.47±0.55 km
- Synodic rotation period: 9.646±0.001 h 12.0893±0.0035 h
- Geometric albedo: 0.066±0.009; 0.077±0.003; 0.0773 (derived); 0.0779±0.0154
- Spectral type: C
- Absolute magnitude (H): 10.80 · 11.0 · 11.01±0.36

1361 Leuschneria, provisional designation 1935 QA, is a carbonaceous asteroid from the outer regions of the asteroid belt, approximately 30 kilometers in diameter. It was discovered on 30 August 1935, by Belgian astronomer Eugène Delporte at Uccle Observatory in Belgium, and named after American astronomer Armin Otto Leuschner.

== Orbit ==
Leuschneria is a carbonaceous C-type asteroid that orbits the Sun at a distance of 2.7–3.5 AU once every 5 years and 5 months (1,976 days). Its orbit has an eccentricity of 0.13 and an inclination of 22° with respect to the ecliptic. It was first observed at Johannesburg Observatory, extending the body's observation arc by 3 days prior to its official discovery observation at Uccle.

== Naming ==
This minor planet was named after American astronomer Armin Otto Leuschner (1868–1953), on a proposal by Sylvain Arend during a visit to Berkeley, where Leuschner was the director of the Leuschner Observatory at University of California. He is known for his books Celestial Mechanics and The Minor Planets of the Hecuba Group. Naming citation was first mentioned in The Names of the Minor Planets by Paul Herget in 1955 (H 123). The lunar crater Leuschner is also named in his honor.

== Physical characteristics ==
=== Lightcurve ===
In May and June 2015, two rotational lightcurves of Leuschneria were obtained from photometric observations by Maurice Clark at Preston Gott Observatory of Texas Tech University, United States, and by Giovanni Casalnuovo at Eurac Observatory (C62) in Bolzano, Italy. Lightcurve analysis gave a rotation period of 12.0893 and 9.646 hours with a brightness amplitude of 0.75 and 0.19 magnitude, respectively (U=2/2-).

=== Diameter and albedo ===
According to the surveys carried out by the Japanese Akari satellite and NASA's Wide-field Infrared Survey Explorer with its subsequent NEOWISE mission, Leuschneria measures between 29.637 and 33.47 kilometers in diameter and its surface has a respective albedo between 0.066 and 0.0779. The Collaborative Asteroid Lightcurve Link derives an albedo of 0.0773 and a diameter of 30.16 kilometers with an absolute magnitude of 11.0.
