= Robert L. Leuschner Jr. =

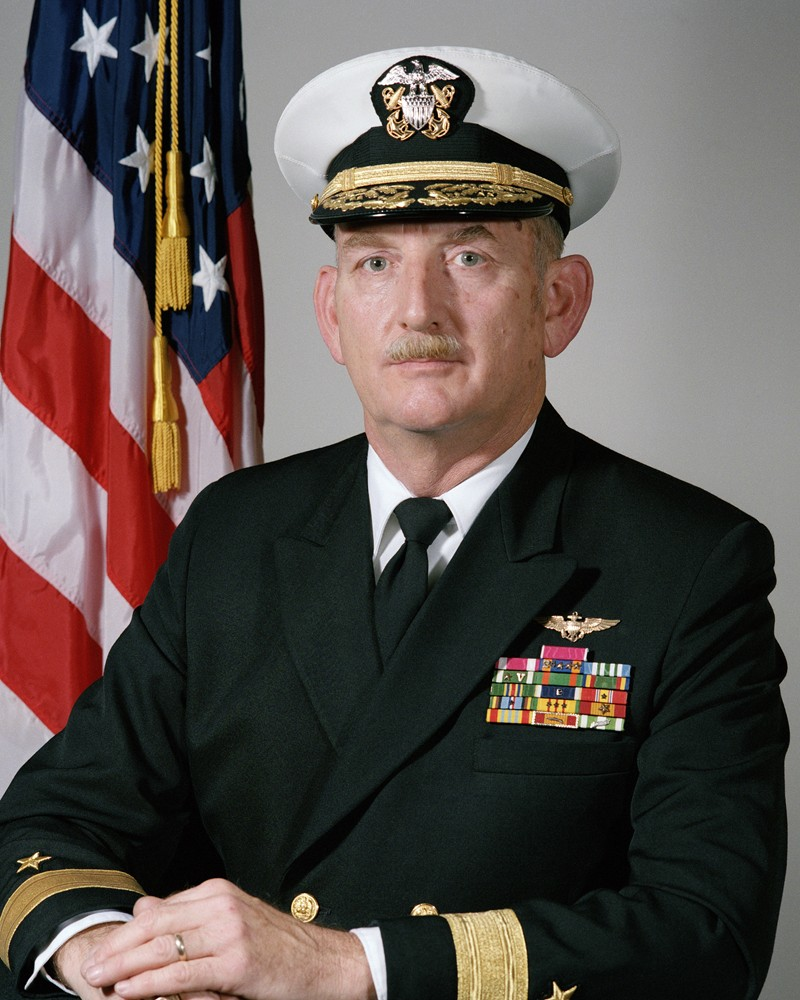
- Born: March 13, 1935; Waco, Texas, U.S.
- Died: July 19, 2016 (aged 81)
- Military career
- Allegiance: United States
- Branch: United States Navy
- Service years: 1957–1986
- Rank: Rear admiral
- Commands: USS Enterprise (CVN-65); USS San Diego (AFS-6); VA-155

Robert Lee Leuschner Jr. (March 13, 1935 – July 19, 2016) was a rear admiral in the United States Navy. He was Commander of the nuclear-powered carrier USS Enterprise from 1983 to 1986. A native of Texas, he was born in Waco, and later moved with his family to San Diego, California, where he graduated from high school. In 1953, he was admitted to Rice Institute in Houston, where he enrolled in the chemical engineering curriculum. He also joined the Naval Reserve Officer Training Corps (NROTC), so that immediately after receiving his bachelor's degree, he was also commissioned as ensign in the U.S. Navy.

== Early years ==
Leuschner Jr was one of three children of Captain Robert Leuschner, who served aboard USS South Dakota during the Second World War and was present at Tokyo Bay for the Armistice. Leuschner, known as "Skip" by most of his school classmates, attended high school in San Diego, California. He was then admitted to Rice University, then named Rice Institute, where he joined the Naval Reserve Officer Training Corps (NROTC), majored in chemical engineering and graduated with a bachelor's degree in May 1957. He was immediately commissioned as ensign in the U.S. Navy, which would set his life career course.

== Naval career ==
In September, 1957, he began flight training at Corpus Christi, Texas, becoming designated as a naval aviator in December, 1958. He was then posted to Naval Air Station Miramar, California. (Note: Later renamed Marine Corps Air Station Miramar. Miramar was formerly the site of the Navy Fighter Weapons School (NFWS) and the TOPGUN training school until 1996.)

Leuschner spent four years based at Miramar flying the Douglas A-1 Skyraider with the Attack Squadron 5-2. As part of this tour, he flew from USS Ticonderoga, in the Western Pacific, and USS Lexington, off South America.

In 1963, Leuschner entered the Naval Test Pilot School at Patuxent River, Maryland, after which he served for two years as a test pilot and project officer in the Flight Test Division. He then went to the Naval Air Station at Lemoore, California to train on flying the Douglas A-4 Skyhawk, before he was deployed in 1967 to Southeast Asia, where he became the squadron safety and weapons officer aboard the USS Intrepid. Returning to Lemoore, he trained to fly the A-7B Corsair II, after which he was redeployed to Southeast Asia, with Attack Squadron 2-1-5, aboard USS Enterprise. He returned to Lemoore, where he served as weapons officer, aircraft maintenance officer and operations officer until 1972. During this period, he was awarded the Navy Achievement Medal for establishing the Pacific Fleet Light Weapons School (LAWS) for postgraduate level air-to-ground weapons training. From 1972 to 1974, Leuschner served aboard the USS Oriskany as executive officer and commanding officer of Attack Squadron 1-5-5 (the "Silver Foxes")

Leuschner attended the Naval War College at Newport, Rhode Island in 1975, then was selected for nuclear power training, which he completed in early 1977. In June 1977, he was posted to USS Nimitz as a relief operations officer. He was made executive officer on the Nimitz from 1978 until July 1979. After a short tour of duty onshore as a staff officer for Commander Tactical Wings, U.S. Atlantic Fleet, he was named commander of the combat stores ship USS San Diego in July 1980.

Reporting to the staff of the Commander, Naval Air Force, U.S. Atlantic Fleet, in March, 1982, he directed a variety of special projects to improve the combat readiness and material condition of the United States Sixth Fleet aircraft carriers. On June 17, 1983, Leuschner became commander of the USS Enterprise.

== Relief of command ==
The then-Capt. Robert Leuschner was replaced 27 January 1986 as skipper of the USS Enterprise after the ship struck a barely submerged rock on a seamount (Cortes Bank) 100 miles west of San Diego in November 1985, causing $17 million in damage to the hull.

== Awards, honors and medals ==
Leuschner's individual awards include the:

- Legion of Merit,
- Meritorious Service Medal,
- Air Medal (28 awards).
- Navy Commendation Medal with Gold Star and Combat " V ",
- Navy Achievement Medal,
- Navy Unit Commendation Medal,
- Joint Services Commendation Medal

He also received various theater and campaign ribbons. Captain Leuschner has been selected for promotion to the rank of commodore.

== See also ==
- Cortes Bank
