= NGC 3599 =

Lenticular galaxy in the Leo constellation

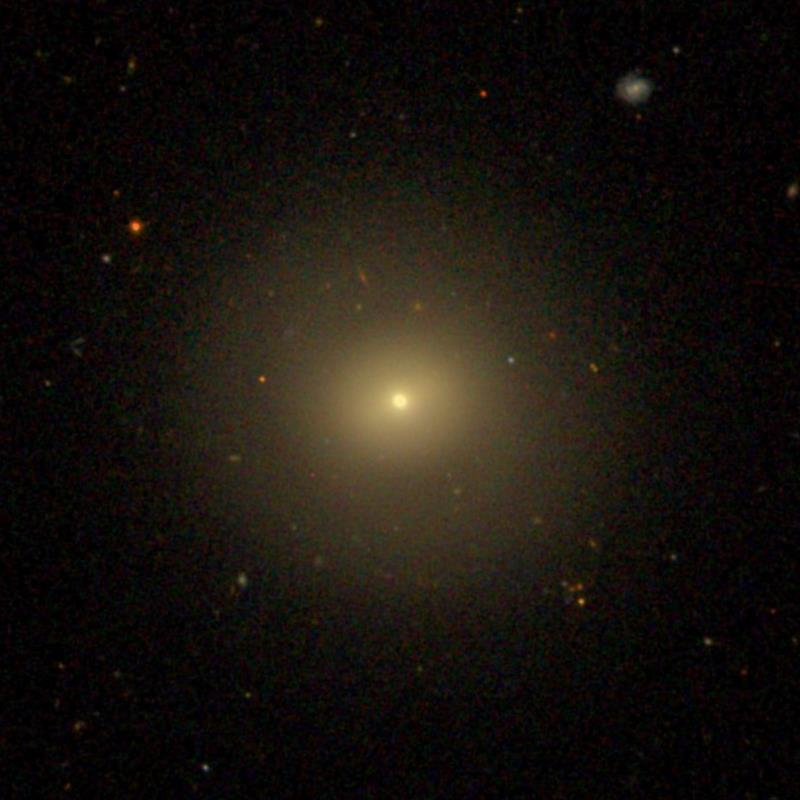
- NGC 3599 by Sloan Digital Sky Survey

Observation data (J2000 epoch)
- Constellation: Leo
- Right ascension: 11^{h} 15^{m} 26.949^{s}
- Declination: +18° 06′ 37.43″
- Redshift: 0.00277
- Heliocentric radial velocity: 876±18 km/s
- Distance: 67 Mly (20.4 Mpc)
- Apparent magnitude (V): 10.178

Characteristics
- Type: SA0:

Other designations
- NGC 3599, UGC 6281, MCG +03-29-015, PGC 34326

NGC 3599 is a lenticular galaxy located in the constellation Leo. It was discovered by William Herschel on March 14, 1784. The galaxy is located at a distance of 67 million light-years (20.4 Mpc) from the Sun. NGC 3599 is a member of the Leo II group of galaxies in the Virgocentric flow.

The morphological classification of NGC 3599 is SA0:, which indicates this is a lenticular galaxy but with some uncertainty in the classification. There is a weak ring structure 45″ to 71″ from the nucleus, and a small bar about 11″ in length. The galaxy is inclined at an angle of 28° to the plane of the sky, so it is being viewed from nearly face-on. The nucleus is compact and not associated with any non-thermal activity. Although not optically active, NGC 3599 is classified as a Seyfert 2 or a LINER-type galaxy. The mass of the central black hole is estimated at (1.3±0.6)×10^{6} M_{☉}.

In 2003, a sudden rise in X-ray emission from NGC 3599 was observed by the XMM-Newton space observatory. Follow-up observations showed a rapid decay in flux during the following years. This was originally suggested as a candidate tidal disruption event but it may instead have been caused by thermal instability of the accretion disk orbiting a black hole.
