= Leuschner (crater) =

Crater on the Moon

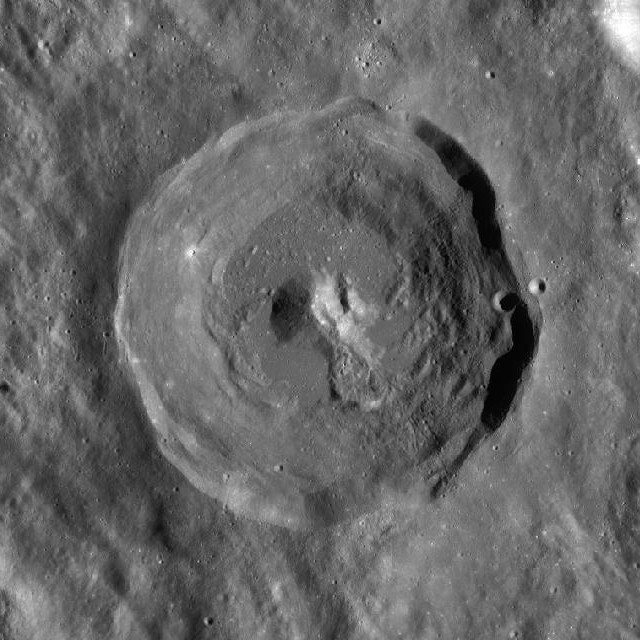
- LRO WAC image
- Coordinates: 1.8°N 108.0°W
- Diameter: 49 km
- Depth: Unknown
- Colongitude: 108° at sunrise
- Eponym: Armin O. Leuschner

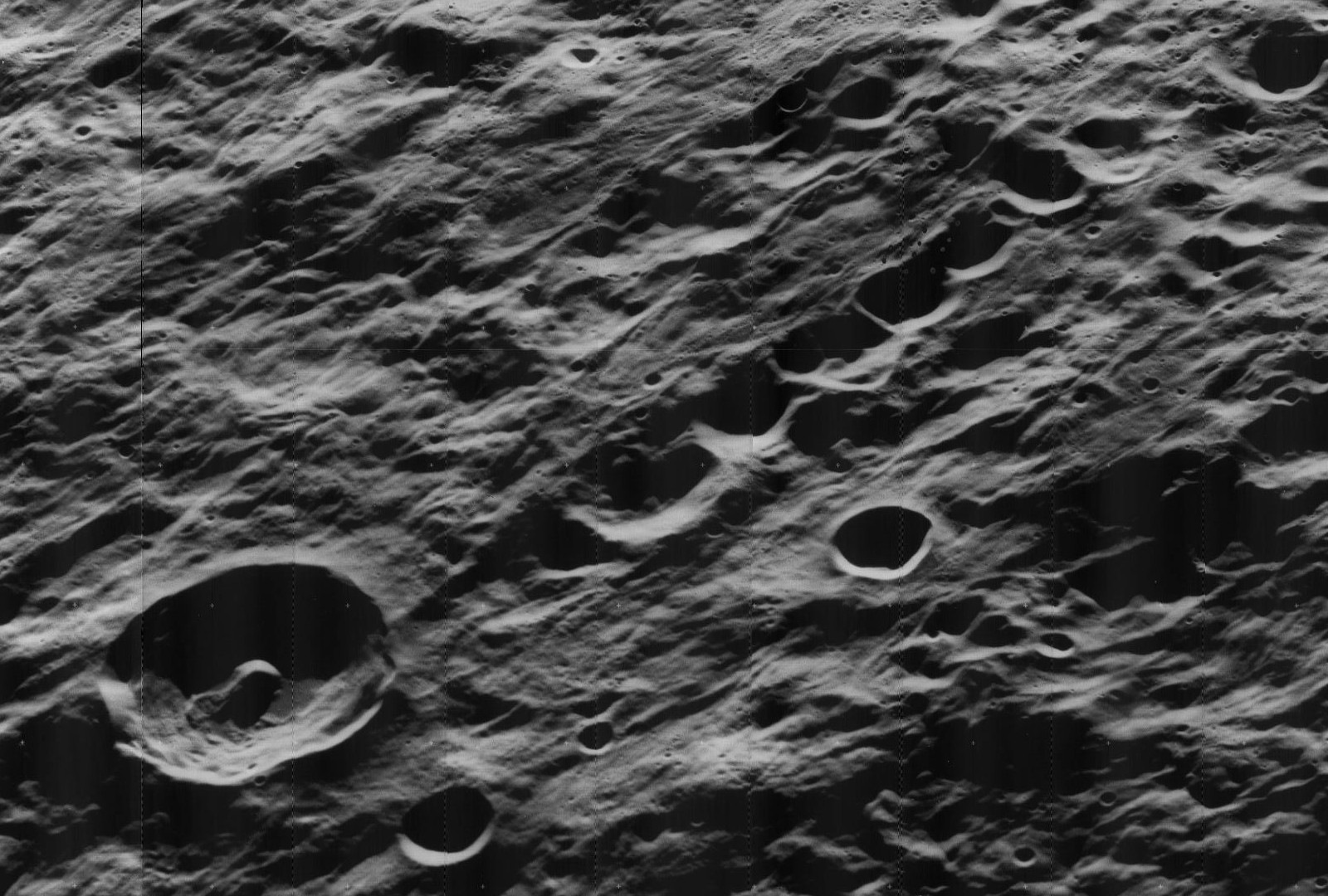
Oblique Lunar Orbiter 5 view of Leuschner (lower left) with Catena Leuschner (row of craters center to upper right), facing west

Leuschner is a lunar impact crater that is located on the Moon's far side, to the northwest of the Montes Cordillera. It lies to the north of the crater Grachev, in the outer skirt of ejecta surrounding the Mare Orientale impact basin. This is a circular crater with a rim that has only been lightly eroded by subsequent impacts. Within the interior floor is a central ridge formation. The infrared spectrum of pure crystalline plagioclase has been identified on the central peak.

The Catena Leuschner is a crater chain formation that begins at the northern outer rim of Leuschner and runs to the northwest towards the crater Kolhörster. This feature is radial to the Mare Orientale impact, and was likely caused by larger chunks of ejecta during the formation of that feature.

== Satellite craters ==
By convention these features are identified on lunar maps by placing the letter on the side of the crater midpoint that is closest to Leuschner.

Leuschner	Latitude	Longitude	Diameter
L	1.1° S	108.8° W	18 km
Z	5.3° N	109.3° W	18 km

== See also ==
- 1361 Leuschneria, minor planet
