= NGC 3457 =

Galaxy in the constellation Leo

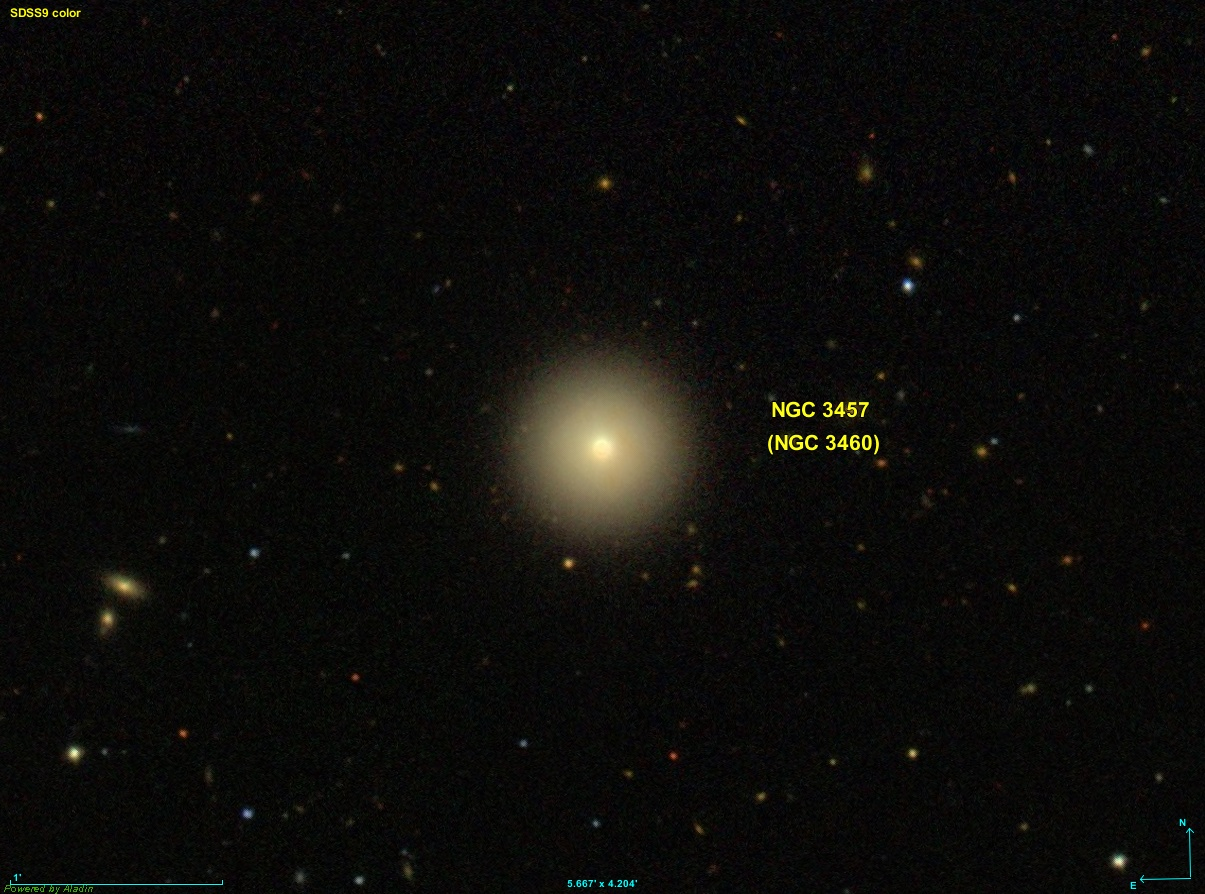
- Sloan Digital Sky Survey image of NGC 3457.

Observation data
- Constellation: Leo
- Right ascension: 10^{h} 56^{m} 11^{s}
- Declination: +17° 28′ 56″

NGC 3457 is an elliptical galaxy located in the constellation Leo. It was discovered on January 5, 1887, by the astronomer Francis Baily.
