= 718 Erida =

Main-belt asteroid

Discovery
- Discovered by: J. Palisa
- Discovery site: Vienna Obs.
- Discovery date: 29 September 1911

Designations
- Alternative designations: 1911 MS

Orbital characteristics
- Epoch 31 July 2016 (JD 2457600.5)
- Uncertainty parameter 0
- Observation arc: 113.31 yr (41,388 d)
- Aphelion: 3.6666 AU (548.52 Gm)
- Perihelion: 2.4451 AU (365.78 Gm)
- Semi-major axis: 3.0559 AU (457.16 Gm)
- Eccentricity: 0.19985
- Orbital period (sidereal): 5.34 yr (1,951.2 d)
- Mean anomaly: 5.10173°
- Mean motion: 0° 11^{m} 4.2^{s} / day
- Inclination: 6.9294°
- Longitude of ascending node: 38.538°
- Argument of perihelion: 174.377°

Physical characteristics
- Mean radius: 36.47±2.45 km
- Synodic rotation period: 17.447 h (0.7270 d)
- Geometric albedo: 0.0399±0.006
- Absolute magnitude (H): 9.6

718 Erida is a minor planet orbiting the Sun. It was discovered at Vienna on September 29, 1911, by Austrian astronomer Johann Palisa, and was named for Erida Leuschner, daughter of astronomer Armin Otto Leuschner. It is orbiting at a distance of 3.06 AU with a period of 5.34 yr and an eccentricity of 0.20. The orbital plane of this asteroid is inclined by an angle of 6.9° to the plane of the ecliptic.

Photometric observations made during 2009 were used to produce a light curve for this asteroid that showed a rotation period of 17.447±0.002 h with a brightness variation of 0.37 in magnitude. It spans a girth of approximately 72 km.
