= NGC 3455 =

Galaxy in the constellation Leo

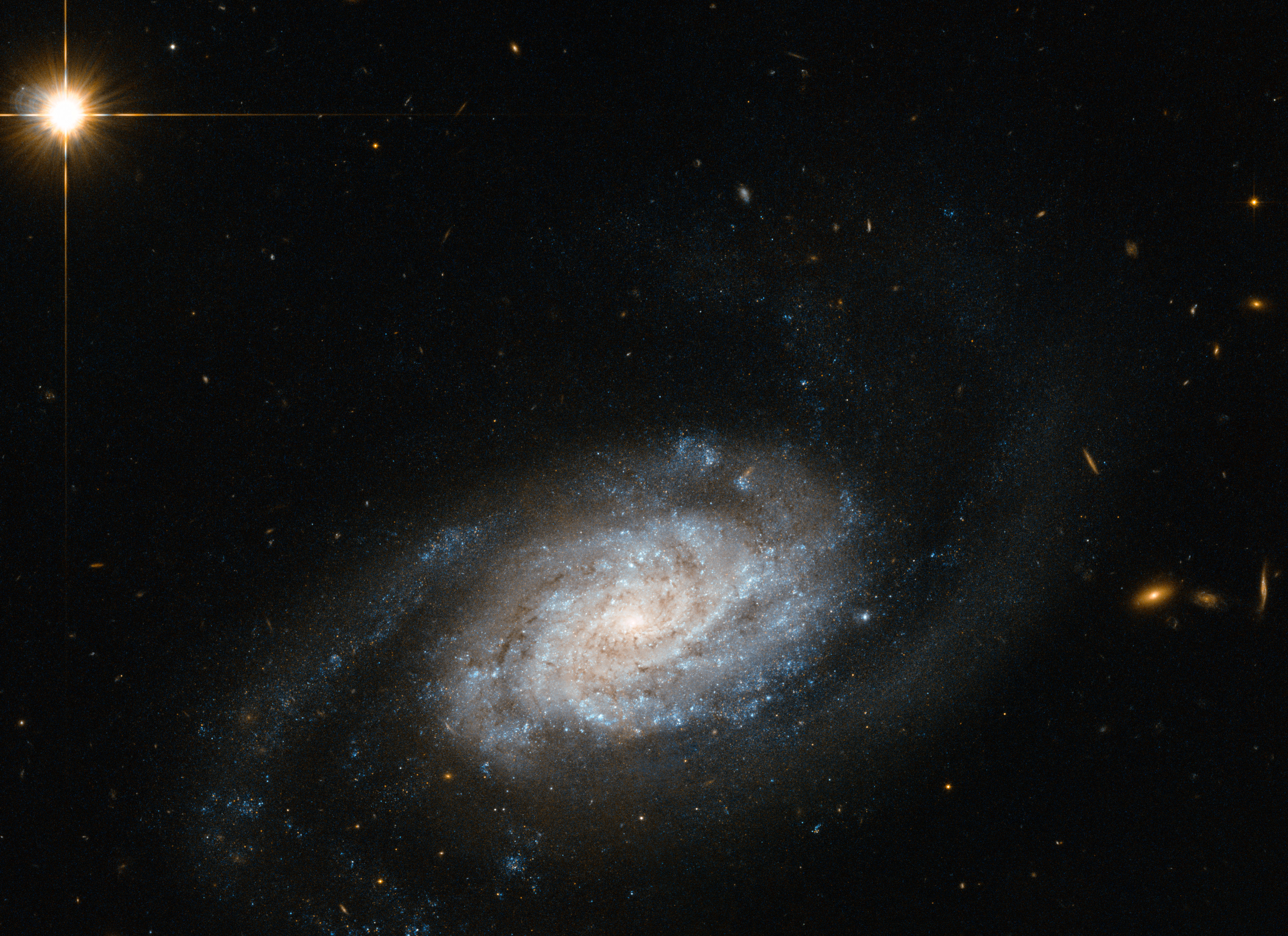
- NGC 3455 spiral galaxy taken by Hubble Space Telescope.

Observation data (J2000 epoch)
- Constellation: Leo
- Right ascension: 10^{h} 54^{m} 31.066^{s}
- Declination: +17° 17′ 04.59″
- Redshift: 0.003730
- Heliocentric radial velocity: 1117
- Distance: 65 million ly
- Apparent magnitude (B): 13.1

Characteristics
- Type: SABb

Other designations
- MCG+03-28-031, Z 95-62, [M98c] 105151.6+173308, IRAS 10518+1733, PSCz Q10518+1733, Z 1051.9+1733, [T76] 25B, KPG 257b, QDOT B1051512+173306, [BEC2010] HRS 30, LEDA 32767, UGC 6028, [CHM2007] HDC 632 J105431.06+1717045, 2MASX J10543106+1717045, UZC J105431.1+171704, [CHM2007] LDC 778 J105431.06+1717045

NGC 3455 is an intermediate spiral galaxy located 65 million light-years away in the constellation of Leo. It is a member of the NGC 3370 Group of galaxies, which is a member of the Leo II Groups, a series of galaxies and galaxy clusters strung out from the right edge of the Virgo Supercluster.

== Gallery ==
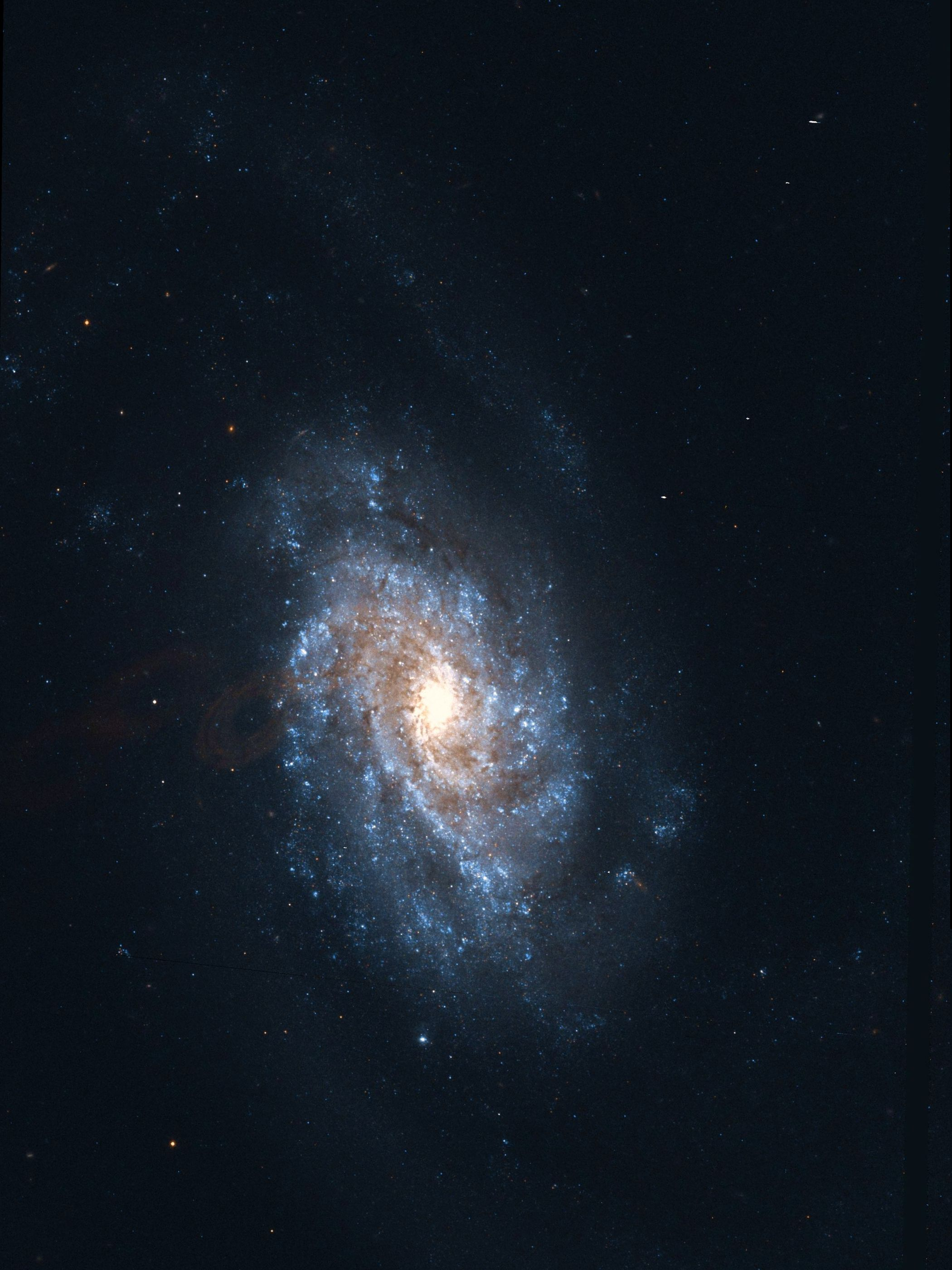
NGC 3455 by Hubble Space Telescope

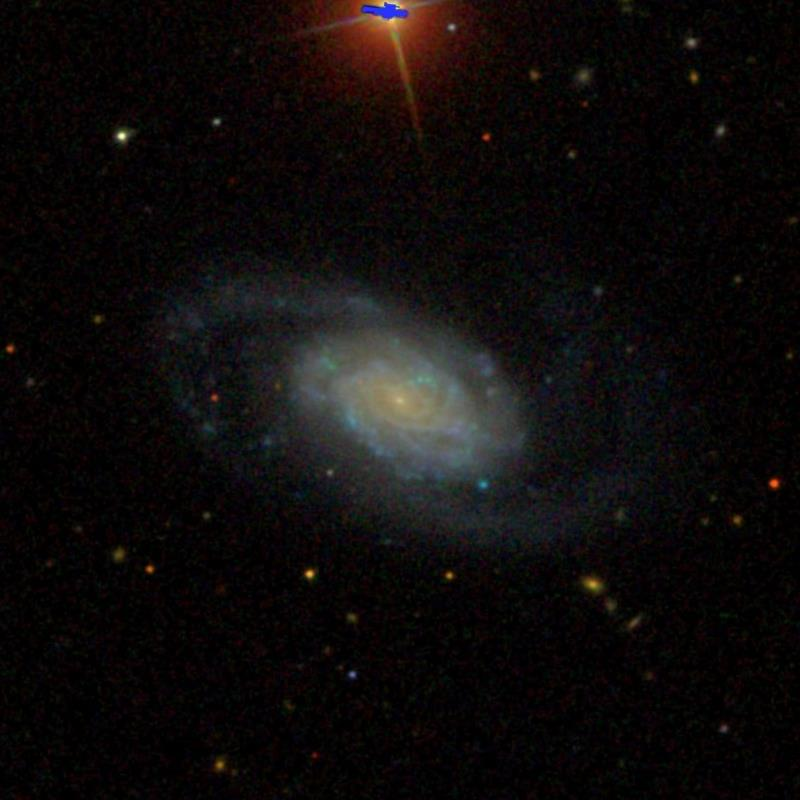
SDSS image of NGC 3455.

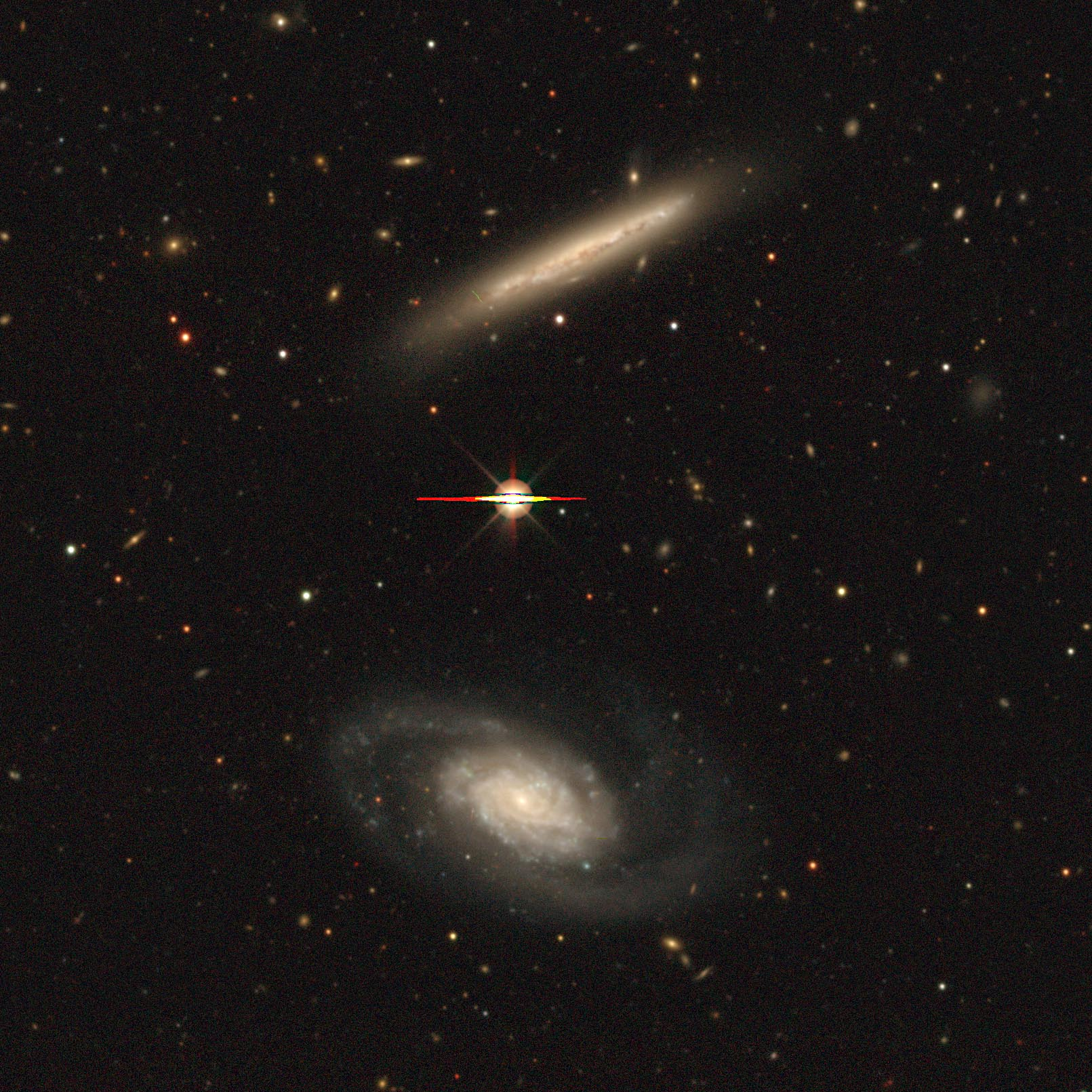
NGC 3454 (top) and NGC 3455 (bottom) with the legacy surveys
