= Armin Otto Leuschner =

American astronomer and educator (1868–1953)

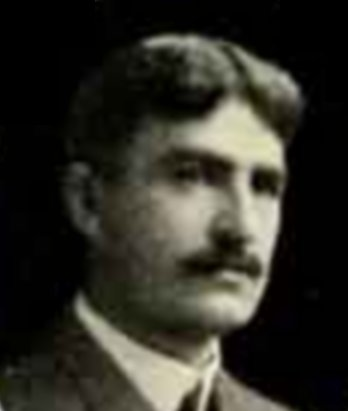
- Leuschner around 1920
- Born: January 16, 1868
- Died: April 22, 1953 (aged 85)
- Education: University of Berlin
- Scientific career
- Fields: Astronomy
- Workplaces: University of California, Berkeley

Armin Otto Leuschner (January 16, 1868 – April 22, 1953) was an American astronomer and educator.

== Early life and education ==
Leuschner was born on January 16, 1868, in Detroit, Michigan, but raised in Germany. He returned to the United States for university studies, graduating from the University of Michigan in 1888 with a degree in mathematics. Leuschner then became the first graduate student at Lick Observatory, but due to conflicts with his advisor, Lick director Edward S. Holden, he left Lick before finishing his Ph.D. Leuschner subsequently returned to Germany and attended the University of Berlin, where in 1897 he earned his doctorate with a highly praised thesis on the orbits of comets.

== Career ==
Leuschner returned to California as an associate professor in astronomy at University of California, Berkeley, where he remained for over half a century. He founded an observatory there for student instruction, later renamed in his honor Leuschner Observatory. Together with Lick director James E. Keeler, Leuschner shaped the combined graduate program at Berkeley and Lick into one of the nation's foremost centers of astronomical education. Leuschner's own research continued to focus on the orbits of asteroids and comets; this subject required tremendous amounts of detailed computation, which made the work well-suited to be shared with a long series of students, many of whom went on to successful astronomical careers of their own. More than sixty students received their doctorate under Leuschner's guidance.

In 1913, Leuschner became dean of the entire Graduate School at Berkeley, and later was appointed head of all World War I related training at the university.

He was a founding member of the Astronomical Society of the Pacific, served a term as the president of the American Association of University Professors, and chaired the International Astronomical Union's committee on comets and minor planets for two decades.

Leuschner was one of the first astronomers to dispute Pluto as being Planet X as predicted by Lowell. By 1932 he was already suggesting that Pluto had a mass less than the Earth, and that the discovery of Pluto was an accidental by-product of the Lowell search.

Leuschner at the Fourth Conference International Union for Cooperation in Solar Research at Mount Wilson Observatory, 1910

== Honors ==
Awards

- James Craig Watson Medal (1916)
- Order of the North Star, Sweden (1924)
- Bruce Medal (1936)
- Rittenhouse Medal (1937)
- Halley Lecturer, University of Oxford (1938)

Honors

- Member of the United States National Academy of Sciences (1913)
- Member of the American Philosophical Society (1924)

Named after him

- Leuschner (crater) on the Moon
- Leuschner Observatory
- Main-belt asteroid 1361 Leuschneria
- Asteroid 718 Erida is named after his daughter Erida Leuschner.
