= Leuschner Observatory =

Observatory in California, US

- Named after: Armin Otto Leuschner
- Organization: University of California, Berkeley and San Francisco State University
- Observatory code: 660
- Location: Lafayette, California
- Coordinates: 37.91934°N 122.15385°W
- Altitude: 304 m (997 ft)
- Established: 1886 (Berkeley), 1965 (Lafayette)
- Website: Leuschner Observatory

Telescopes
- 30-inch Telescope: Ritchey-Chrétien telescope
- 3.6-meter Radio Dish: Gregorian

Leuschner Observatory, originally called the Students' Observatory, is an observatory jointly operated by the University of California, Berkeley and San Francisco State University. The observatory was built in 1886 on the Berkeley campus. For many years, it was directed by Armin Otto Leuschner, for whom the observatory was renamed in 1951. In 1965, it was relocated to its present home in Lafayette, California, approximately 10 miles (16 km) east of the Berkeley campus. In 2012, the physics and astronomy department of San Francisco State University became a partner.

Presently, Leuschner Observatory has two operating telescopes. One is a 30-inch (760 mm) optical telescope, equipped with a charge-coupled device (CCD) for observations in visible light and an infrared detector used for infrared astronomy. The other is a 4.3-metre (14 ft) radio dish used for an undergraduate radio astronomy course. The observatory has been used to perform professional astronomy research, such as orbit determination of small Solar System bodies in the early 1900s and supernova surveys in the 1980s and 1990s. It has also served as a primary tool in the education of graduate and undergraduate students at UC Berkeley.

== History ==
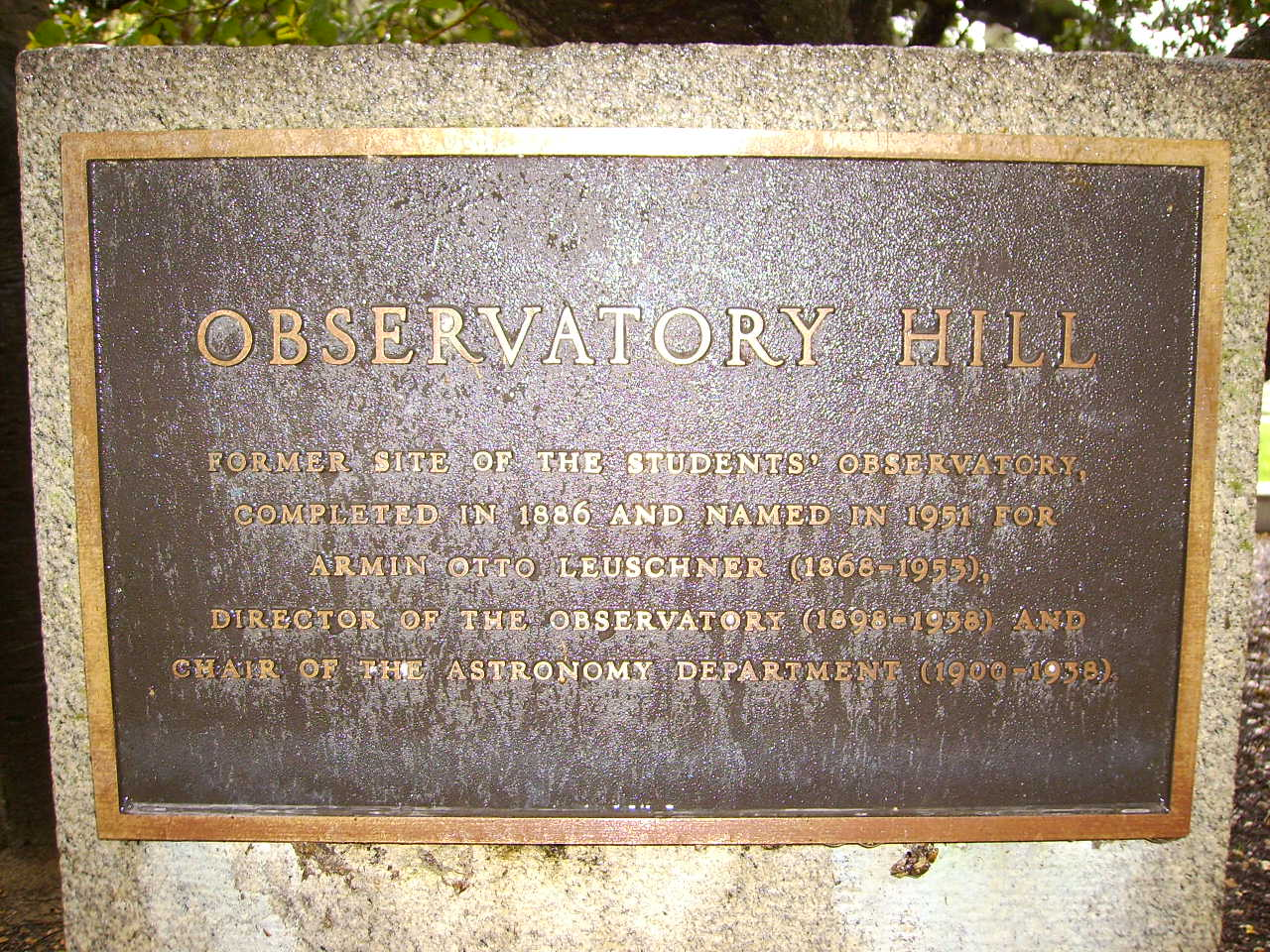
Plaque at the site of the original Students' Observatory

The Students' Observatory was constructed in 1886 on the Berkeley campus, with the original funds provided by the California legislature in order for the observatory to provide practical training to civil engineers. Very quickly, the Students' Observatory became seen as a training ground for students studying astronomy, so that they would be better prepared to go on to use the facilities at Lick Observatory. This contributed to the separation of the departments of civil engineering and astronomy in the mid-1890s, with the Students' Observatory becoming the home of the Berkeley Astronomy Department.

In 1898, Armin Otto Leuschner was appointed the director of the Students' Observatory, a post that he held until his retirement in 1938. During this time, "the observatory became a center for the computation of the orbits of comets, minor planets, and satellites." Astronomer Simon Newcomb said that Leuschner organized the department and observatory into "a thorough school of astronomy, than which [...] there is none better." After he stepped down, the observatory was directed by a series of well regarded astronomers, including Otto Struve from 1950–59 and Louis G. Henyey from 1959–64. The Students' Observatory was renamed Leuschner Observatory by the Regents of the University of California in 1951 in honor of A. O. Leuschner. The Space Sciences Lab, which operates SETI, began operations in 1960 at Leuschner Observatory until a permanent home in the Berkeley hills was completed in 1966.

In 1965, the observatory was relocated a short distance east of the Berkeley campus in the hills of Lafayette, California, on the 283-acre (1.15 km^{2}) Russell Reservation. In 1968, the observatory was equipped with a new 30-inch (76 cm) Ritchey-Chretien telescope built by Tinsley Laboratories. Since, the observatory has been used as a testing ground for a variety of experiments and instruments. The predecessor to the Katzman Automatic Imaging Telescope was tested at Leuschner Observatory in the early 1990s, and in the early 2000s, the first prototype of the telescopes used at the Allen Telescope Array was unveiled at Leuschner. Leuschner Observatory's 30-inch (76 cm) telescope continues to be regularly used in undergraduate astronomical instruction, while the 20-inch (51 cm) telescope was decommissioned and is in disrepair. In 2012, the physics and astronomy department of San Francisco State University bought into the 30-inch (76 cm) telescope. SF State and UC Berkeley staff jointly refurbished and upgraded the motors and control system of the larger telescope; SF State also installed a remote observing station based in its frequently fog-laden San Francisco campus.

In 1972, the original Leuschner observatory dome was donated to Stanford University as part of the construction of the Stanford Student Observatory. The dome was cut in half and moved from Berkeley to the observatory, located on a hill overlooking the golf course next to the Center for Advanced Study in the Behavioral Sciences. The dome was reassembled, and a new motor drive was built to rotate the dome. The observatory was dedicated in October 1973, and is regularly used for classes and public viewing.

== Instruments ==
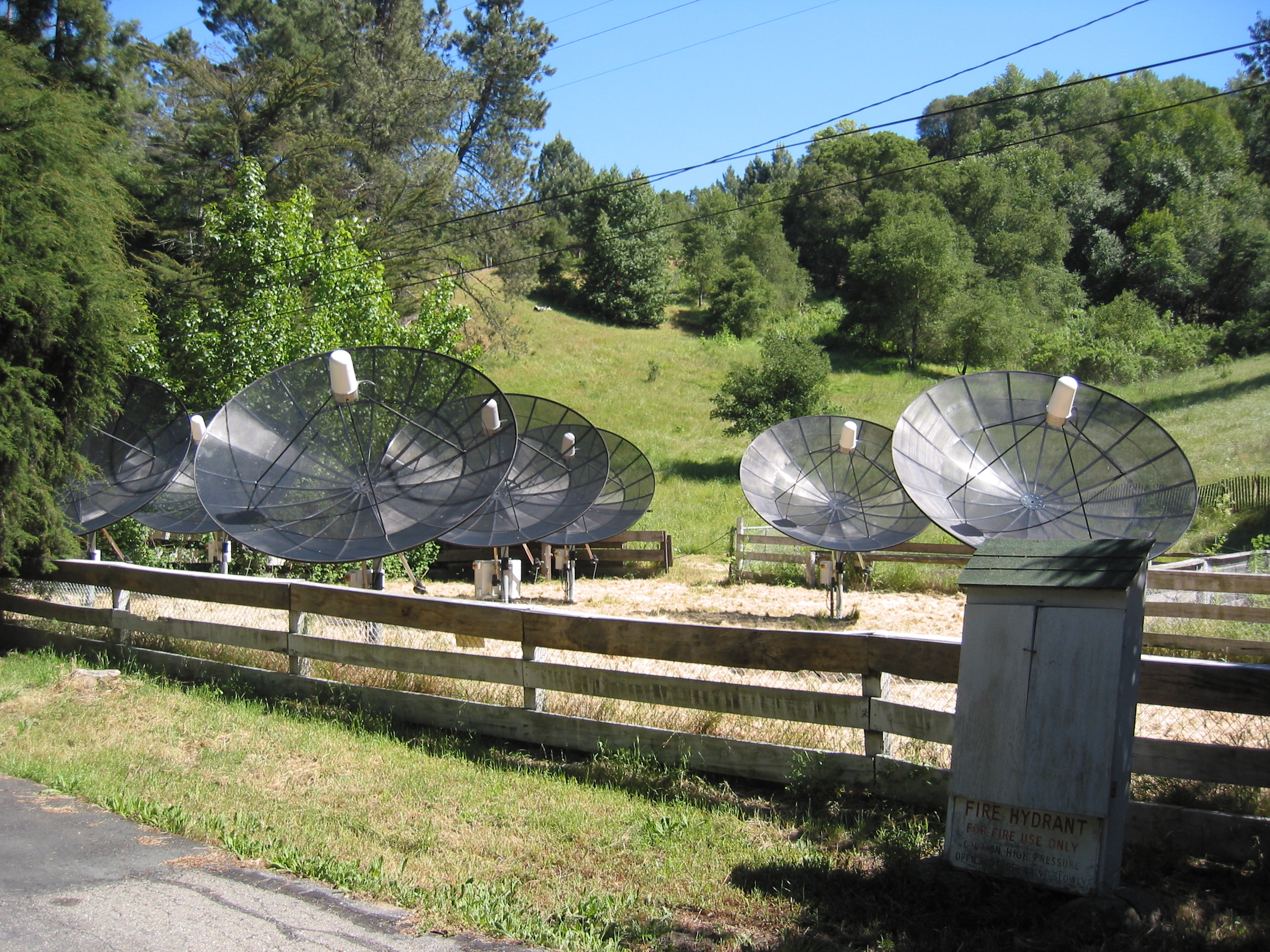
Rapid Prototype Array at Leuschner Observatory.

=== Optical/infrared ===
Leuschner Observatory houses two optical telescopes, one with a 30-inch (76 cm) diameter and the other with a 20-inch (51 cm) diameter. As of 2010, the 20-inch (51 cm) telescope is not usable, and the 30-inch (76 cm) telescope is undergoing upgrades. The 30-inch (76 cm) telescope is of Ritchey-Chretien design, and is equipped with both a CCD for observations in visible light and an infrared detector that was fabricated in 2000 in order to create an infrared laboratory course for undergraduate students at UC Berkeley. Both optical telescopes are also outfitted with control systems which allow them be automated, meaning observations are made with minimal human intervention.

=== Radio ===
Leuschner Observatory is home to a single 3.6-metre (12 ft) radio telescope. The telescope was one of the prototypes for the Allen Telescope Array that were tested at Leuschner, and has since been used in the undergraduate radio astronomy lab. The telescope operates between 1320–1740 MHz and uses an 8192 element spectrometer with spectral resolution of about 1.5 kHz and a 12 MHz bandwidth. The operating range allows for it to be used to observe the 21-cm hydrogen line as well as hydroxyl lines from astrophysical masers.

== Research and discoveries ==
=== Orbit determination ===
Research at the Students' Observatory under A. O. Leuschner was primarily focused on performing astrometry in order to determine orbits for newly discovered comets. When Clyde Tombaugh reported the discovery of Pluto in 1930, Leuschner began observing it using the instruments at Students' Observatory to determine its orbit. Within months of its discovery, Leuschner cast the first doubt on Pluto's status as a planet, suggesting instead that it was unclear whether Pluto was a large asteroid, a planet, or a comet. Using a few weeks of observation at the Students' Observatory, he and his students Fred Whipple and E. C. Bower determined the orbital elements for Pluto and an upper limit of one half the mass of Earth. This mass meant Pluto was insufficiently massive to be the Planet X thought to cause discrepancies between the predicted and observed orbit of Neptune.

=== Supernova ===
The observatory was for a time home to two automated supernova surveys. The Berkeley Automated Supernova Search, led by Saul Perlmutter, who went on to head the Supernova Cosmology Project, used the 30-inch (76 cm) telescope at Leuschner to scan the skies nightly for supernova. The Leuschner Observatory Supernova Search (LOSS) began in 1992, as the Berkeley Automated Imaging Telescope (BAIT) also searched for supernova, in this case under Alex Filippenko. Both were used as testing grounds for automated searches at other sites, with BAIT eventually being succeeded by the Katzman Automatic Imaging Telescope located at Lick Observatory. While LOSS operated at Leuschner, it discovered SN 1992bt, SN 1993G, SN 1993R, SN 1993X, SN 1993Z, SN 1994D, and SN 1994ae.

The 30-inch (76 cm) telescope was also used as part of a program called Hands-On Universe that allows elementary and high school students to request observations on the telescope. In late March 1994, two high school students in Oil City, Pennsylvania, requested observations of the Whirlpool Galaxy. When astronomers discovered SN 1994I in the Whirlpool Galaxy a few days later, they realized that the observations made with the 30-inch (76 cm) telescope at Leuschner had captured the earliest images of the supernova. Even more, the images provided astronomers some of "earliest supernovae light curve data on record."

=== SETI ===
Leuschner Observatory is also home to an optical SETI experiment, carried out under the direction of UC Berkeley astronomer Dan Werthimer. The program consists of a targeted search for bright pulses of short duration around 2500 nearby stars using the automated 30-inch (76 cm) telescope. Similar efforts are carried out at Lick Observatory using the Nickel telescope. The first optical probe SETI study was also conducted at Leuschner in 1979 .

=== Maffei 1 and 2 ===
In 1968, Italian astronomer Paolo Maffei reported observing two strange objects. A graduate student at Berkeley used the 30-inch (76 cm) telescope at Leuschner Observatory to make the first identification of the two objects as being elliptical galaxies. Once it was known what they were, the two objects were named Maffei 1 and Maffei 2 after their discover. In identifying the nature of the objects, astronomers realized they were very nearby objects, perhaps even belonging to the Local Group. While eventually membership in the Local Group was ruled out, Maffei 1 is now recognized as being the nearest major elliptical galaxy.

=== Nemesis ===
In 1984, paleontologists David M. Raup and Jack Sepkoski suggested that extinction events on Earth followed a periodic trend. Richard Muller, a professor of physics at Berkeley, was part of a team that suggested that the Sun had an unseen stellar companion which caused this periodicity, with this hypothetical companion being dubbed Nemesis. Muller was already involved in the automated supernova searches underway at Leuschner, and began the search for Nemesis using the optical telescopes at Leuschner Observatory.

== See also ==
- List of astronomical observatories
- Lists of telescopes
