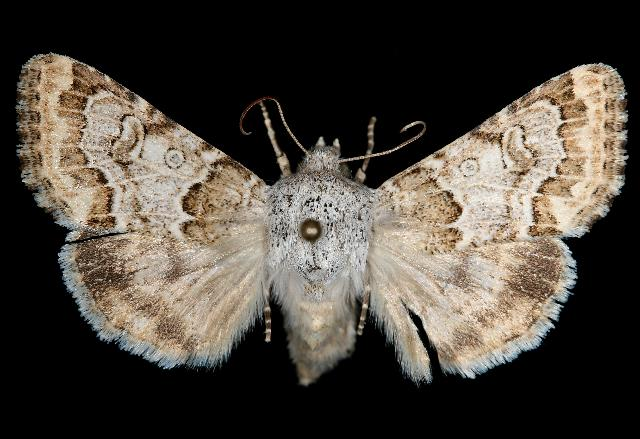

Scientific classification
- Domain: Eukaryota
- Kingdom: Animalia
- Phylum: Arthropoda
- Class: Insecta
- Order: Lepidoptera
- Superfamily: Noctuoidea
- Family: Noctuidae
- Genus: Schinia
- Species: S. deserticola

Binomial name
- Schinia deserticola Barnes & McDunnough, 1916

Synonyms
- Schinia cupes deserticola; Trichosellus cupes deserticola

= Schinia deserticola =

Species of moth

Schinia deserticola is a moth of the family Noctuidae. It is found from southern California to southeastern Arizona and north to west central Utah and southeastern Oregon.

It was formerly considered a subspecies of Schinia cupes.

The wingspan is 22–28 mm.

The larvae feed on Camissonia claviformis.
