= Schinia crotchii =

Scientific classification
- Domain: Eukaryota
- Kingdom: Animalia
- Phylum: Arthropoda
- Class: Insecta
- Order: Lepidoptera
- Superfamily: Noctuoidea
- Family: Noctuidae
- Genus: Schinia
- Species: S. crotchii

Binomial name
- Schinia crotchii (H. Edwards, 1875)

Synonyms
- Heliothis crotchii H. Edwards, 1875; Trichosellus crotchii McDunnough, 1938

Species of moth

Schinia crotchii is a moth of the family Noctuidae. It is found from southeastern Arizona west to the Peninsular Ranges of southern California and north in south-eastern Washington and southern Idaho.

It was formerly considered a synonym of Schinia cupes.

The wingspan is about 26 mm.

The larvae feed on Castilleja exserta.
