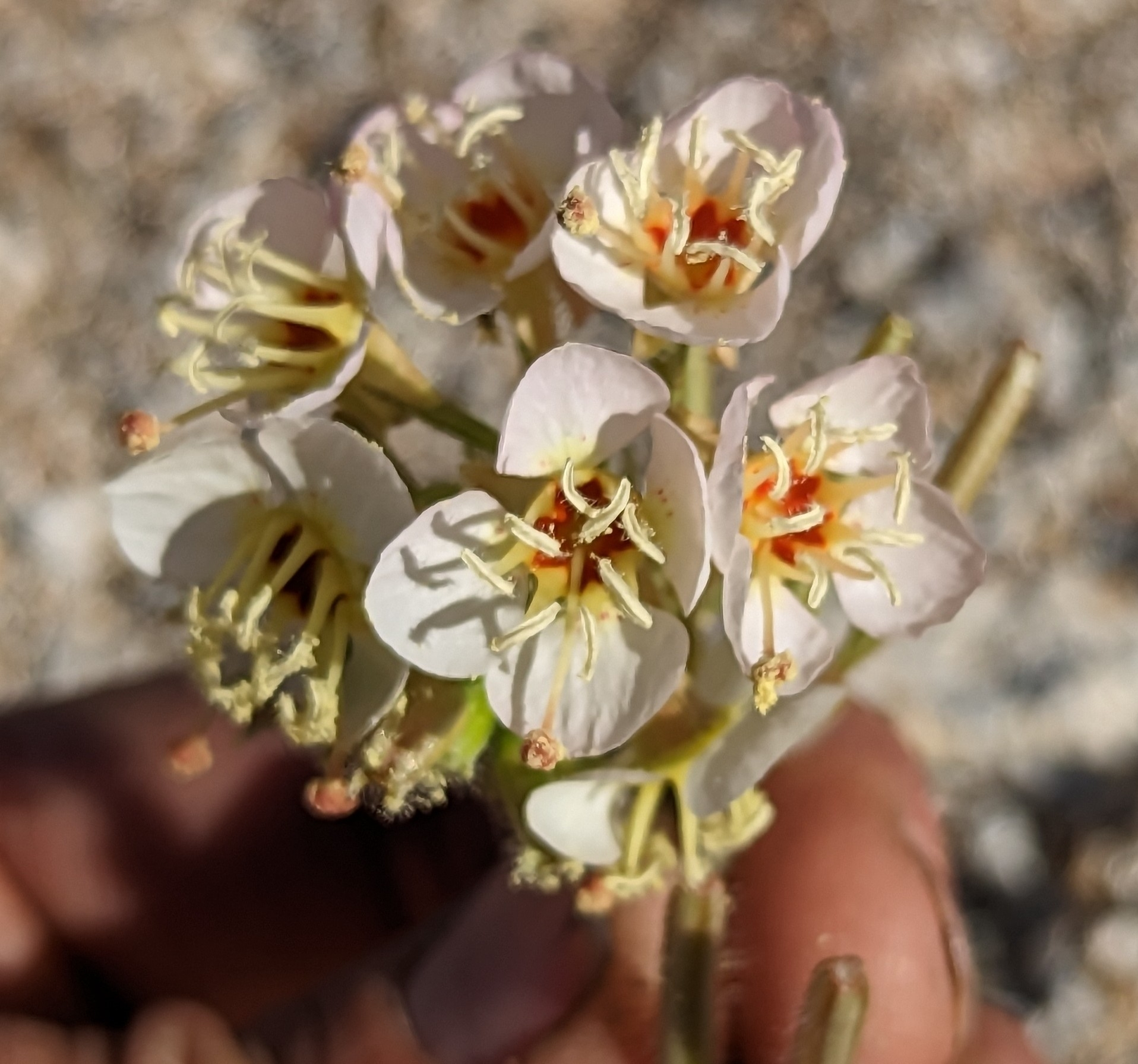

Conservation status
- Unrankable (NatureServe)

Scientific classification
- Kingdom: Plantae
- Clade: Tracheophytes
- Clade: Angiosperms
- Clade: Eudicots
- Clade: Rosids
- Order: Myrtales
- Family: Onagraceae
- Genus: Chylismia
- Species: C. claviformis
- Subspecies: C. c. subsp. peirsonii

Trinomial name
- Chylismia claviformis subsp. peirsonii (Munz) W.L. Wagner & Hoch

= Chylismia claviformis subsp. peirsonii =

Subspecies of desert flower

Chylismia claviformis subsp. peirsonii, commonly known as Peirson's brown-eyed evening primrose, is a subspecies of flowering plant in the family Onagraceae. It is native to the southern California desert regions of the United States.

== Description ==
Chylismia claviformis subsp. peirsonii is an annual herb that grows in sandy soils. It has a basal rosette of lanceolate to narrowly ovate leaves that are often toothed or lobed along the edges, and erect stems that can reach heights of up to 70 cm (27.5 in). The plant is generally covered in fine hairs. The attractive, bowl-shaped flowers have four petals and range in color from yellow to pale pink.

== Distribution and habitat ==
Chylismia claviformis subsp. peirsonii is primarily found in the desert regions of southern California, as well as northern Baja California, Mexico. It inhabits sandy flats, desert washes, and creosote-bush scrub. The subspecies is adapted to survive in arid environments with low precipitation and high temperatures.

== Conservation ==
Chylismia claviformis subsp. peirsonii is not currently listed as endangered or threatened. However, like many native species, it faces challenges due to habitat loss and fragmentation caused by urbanization and agriculture.
