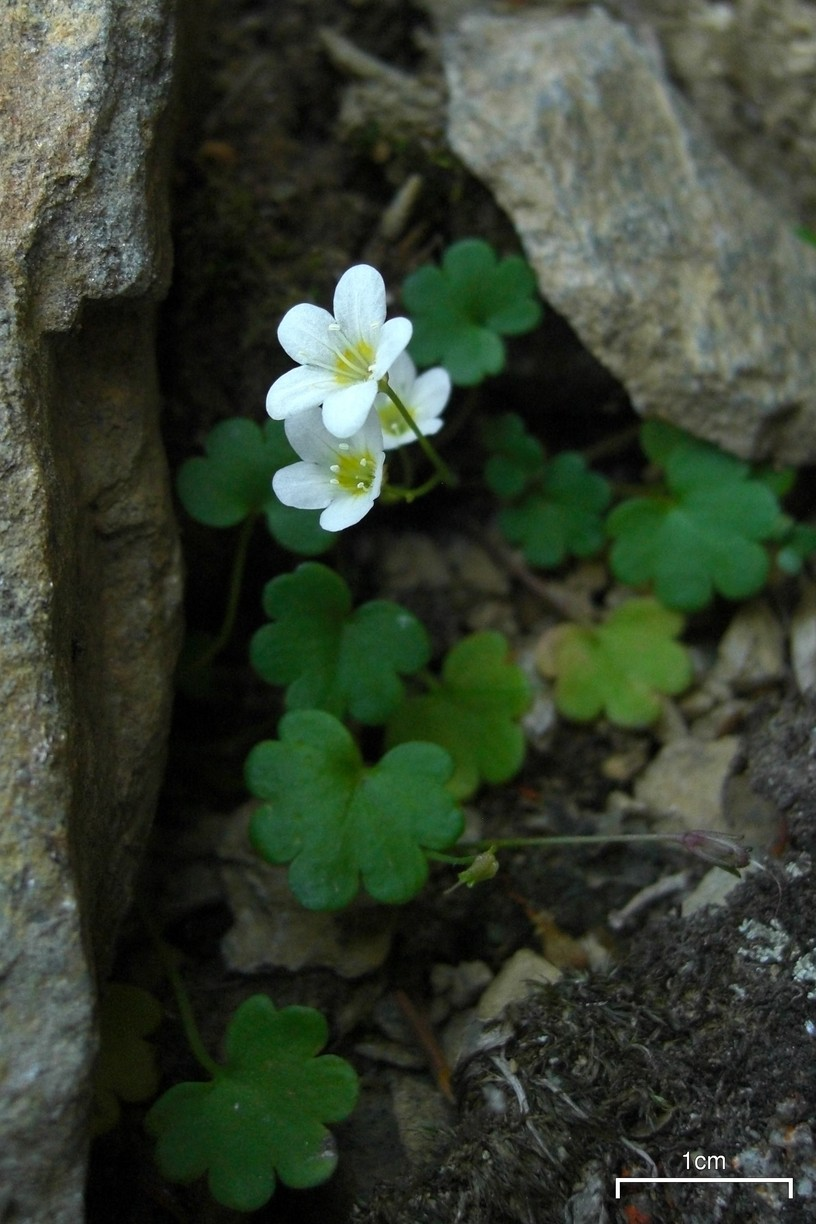
- Romanzoffia sitchensis

Scientific classification
- Kingdom: Plantae
- Clade: Tracheophytes
- Clade: Angiosperms
- Clade: Eudicots
- Clade: Asterids
- Order: Boraginales
- Family: Hydrophyllaceae
- Genus: Romanzoffia; Cham.

Species
- 5 - see text

= Romanzoffia =

Genus of flowering plants

Romanzoffia is a genus of flowering plants in the waterleaf family Hydrophyllaceae. Its species are known as mistmaids or mistmaidens. There are 5 species which are native to western North America from California north to Alaska and the Aleutian Islands. Mistmaids may be annual or perennial and low patchy herbs to small bushes, depending on species. They bear attractive bell-shaped white flowers that make them desirable as ornamentals in the appropriate climates.

== Species ==
Five species are accepted.

- Romanzoffia californica Greene - California mistmaiden
- Romanzoffia sitchensis Bong. - Sitka mistmaiden
- Romanzoffia thompsonii Marttala - Thompson's mistmaiden
- Romanzoffia tracyi Jeps. - Tracy's mistmaiden
- Romanzoffia unalaschcensis Cham. - Alaska mistmaiden
