= Französisches Gymnasium Berlin =

School in Berlin, Germany

Coordinates: 52°30′12″N 13°21′20″E

Französisches Gymnasium Lycée français de Berlin
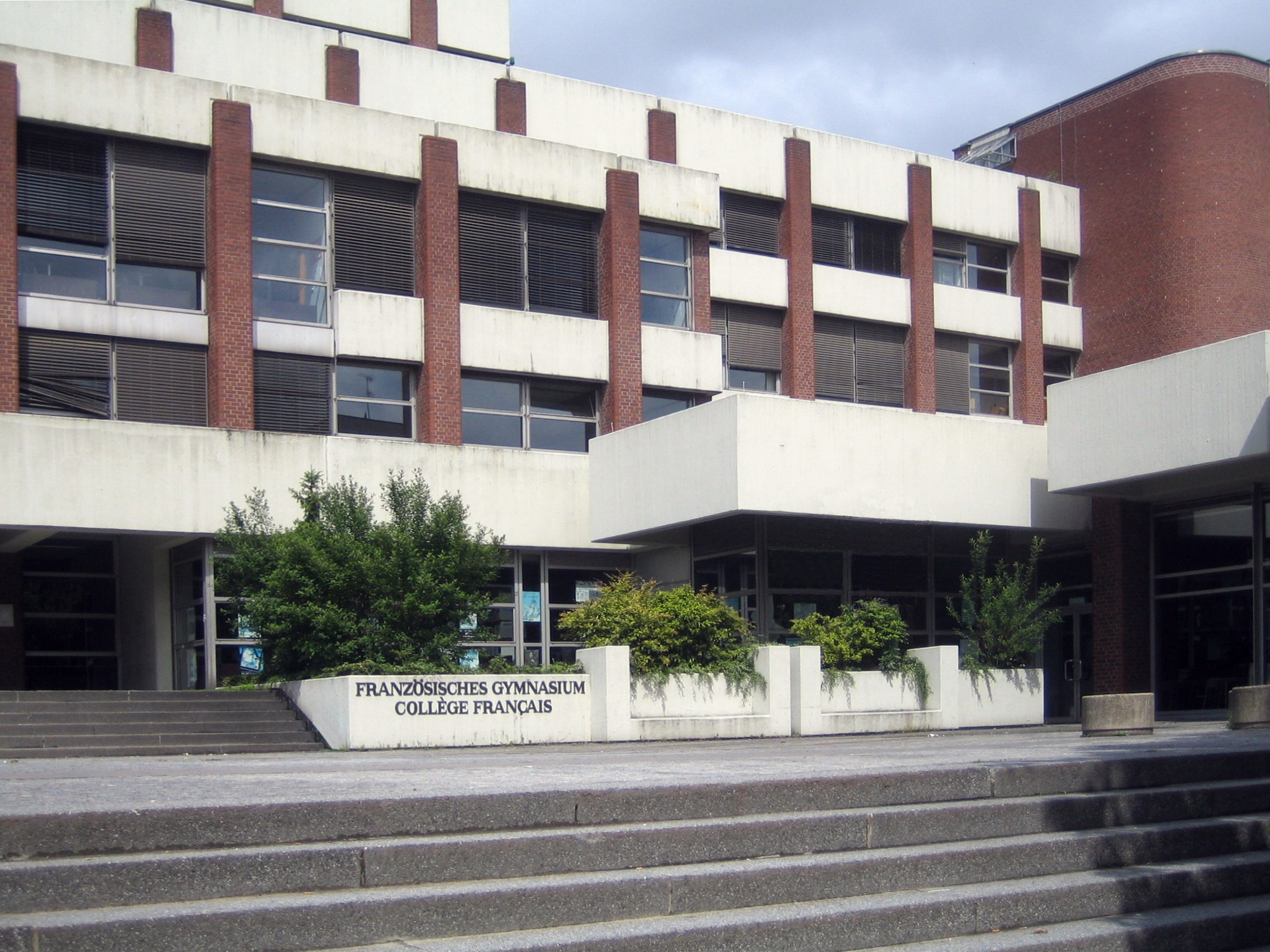
- Entrance on Derfflingerstraße
- Derfflingerstr. 7, 10785 Berlin; Germany

Information
- Type: Gymnasium
- Established: 1689; 337 years ago
- Grades: 5 to 12
- Gender: All genders
- Language: German and French
- Website: fg-berlin.eu

The Französisches Gymnasium (French: Lycée français de Berlin) is a francophone gymnasium in Berlin, Germany. Traditionally, it is widely regarded as an elite high school. It is also the oldest public school in Berlin. Its creation was ordered by Frederick William of Brandenburg.

It is directly operated by the Agency for French Education Abroad (AEFE), an agency of the French government.

== History ==
It was founded in 1689 by Frederick William's son Elector Frederick III of Brandenburg for the children of the Huguenot families who had settled in Brandenburg-Prussia by his invitation, being persecuted for their Protestant beliefs in the Catholic Kingdom of France after the Revocation of the Edict of Nantes by King Louis XIV in October 1685. Its first headmaster was the French jurist Charles Ancillon from Metz.

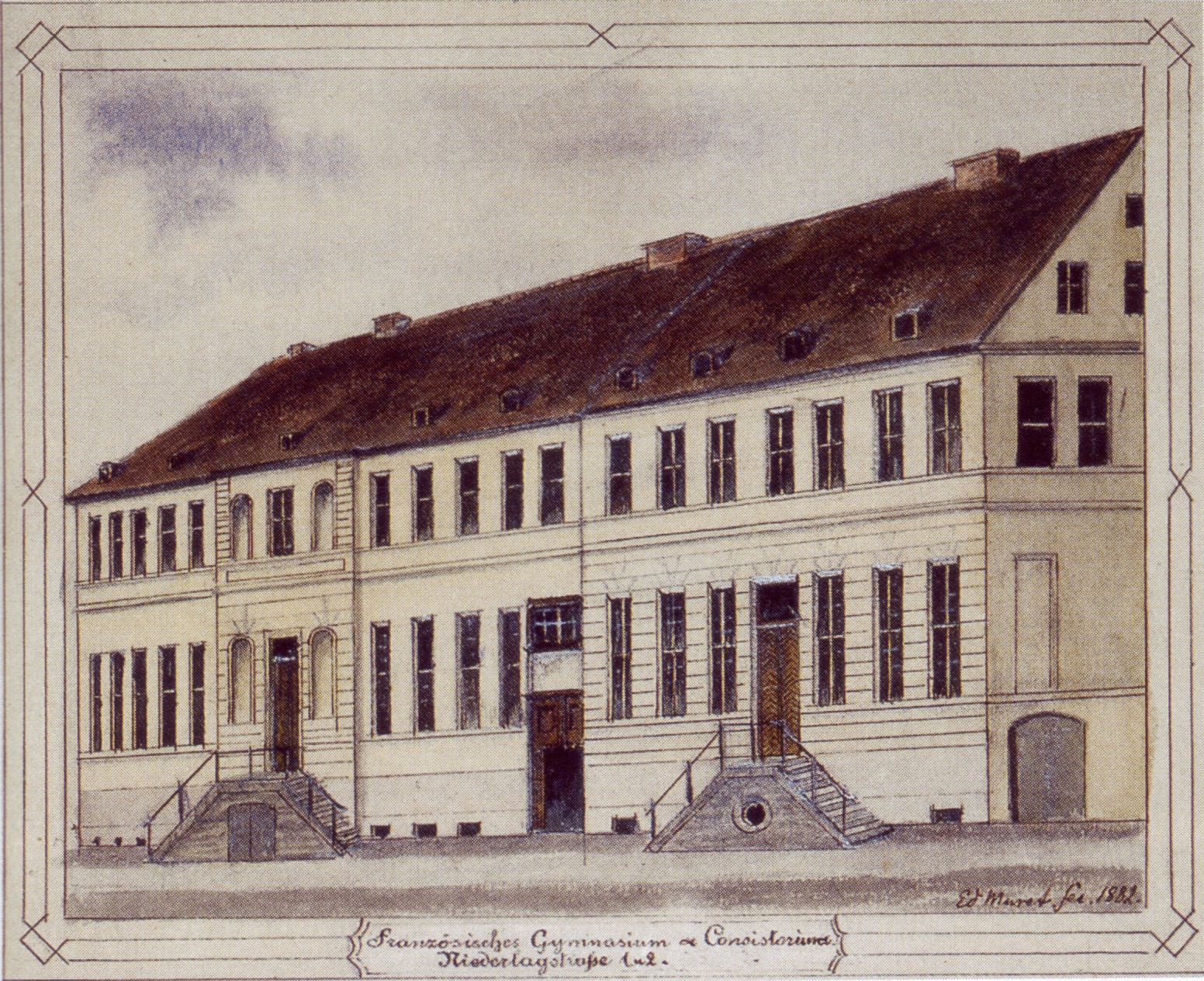
Original site of the Französisches Gymnasium on Niederlagstraße, Berlin-Mitte

Since its foundation, the school has had an almost continuous history, occupying several buildings in Berlin. In the beginning, the faculty comprised Huguenot refugees only and the language of education was French. The school soon was attended also by numerous German children of school fee paying Prussian nobles and officials, and developed into an elite school.

In the course of the Prussian reforms, the Collège Français became a common public school in 1809. In view of the growing numbers of pupils, it moved into a larger building built on Reichstagsufer in the Dorotheenstadt quarter in 1873. The school was attended by an above-average number of Jewish pupils, who under the Nazi regime — like Jewish teachers — were harassed and finally excluded in 1938. However, despite all nationalist efforts, the French language remained the medium of teaching. After 1943 the school was evacuated from Berlin and the historic school building on Reichstagsufer was destroyed in 1945.

After the war, the school moved to the Wedding district in the French sector of what was to become West Berlin. In 1952 the Französisches Gymnasium — Collège Français Berlin was re-established by merging the traditional Huguenot school with the Berlin collège of the French Armed Forces.

Several of its pupils (though not all graduated) became prominent in later life, among them the poet Adalbert von Chamisso, the authors Maximilian Harden and Kurt Tucholsky, the engineer Walter Dornberger and the resistance fighter Adam von Trott zu Solz, the singer-songwriters Reinhard Mey and Ulrich Roski, as well as political scientist Gesine Schwan, the presidential candidate of the Social Democratic Party of Germany in 2009.

== Today ==
The school moved to its current building, in Berlin-Tiergarten, on Derfflingerstraße, not far from Nollendorfplatz in 1972, after it had been located in Berlin-Reinickendorf. It educates both German- and French-speaking pupils from francophone countries all over the world. Grades are from 5 to 12, with bilingual classes and teaching starting in grade 7. Other languages that are taught are English, Latin, Ancient Greek and Spanish. Pupils can graduate with either of two diplomas though many Germans pass both: the Abitur (German high school diploma) and the Baccalauréat (French high school diploma).

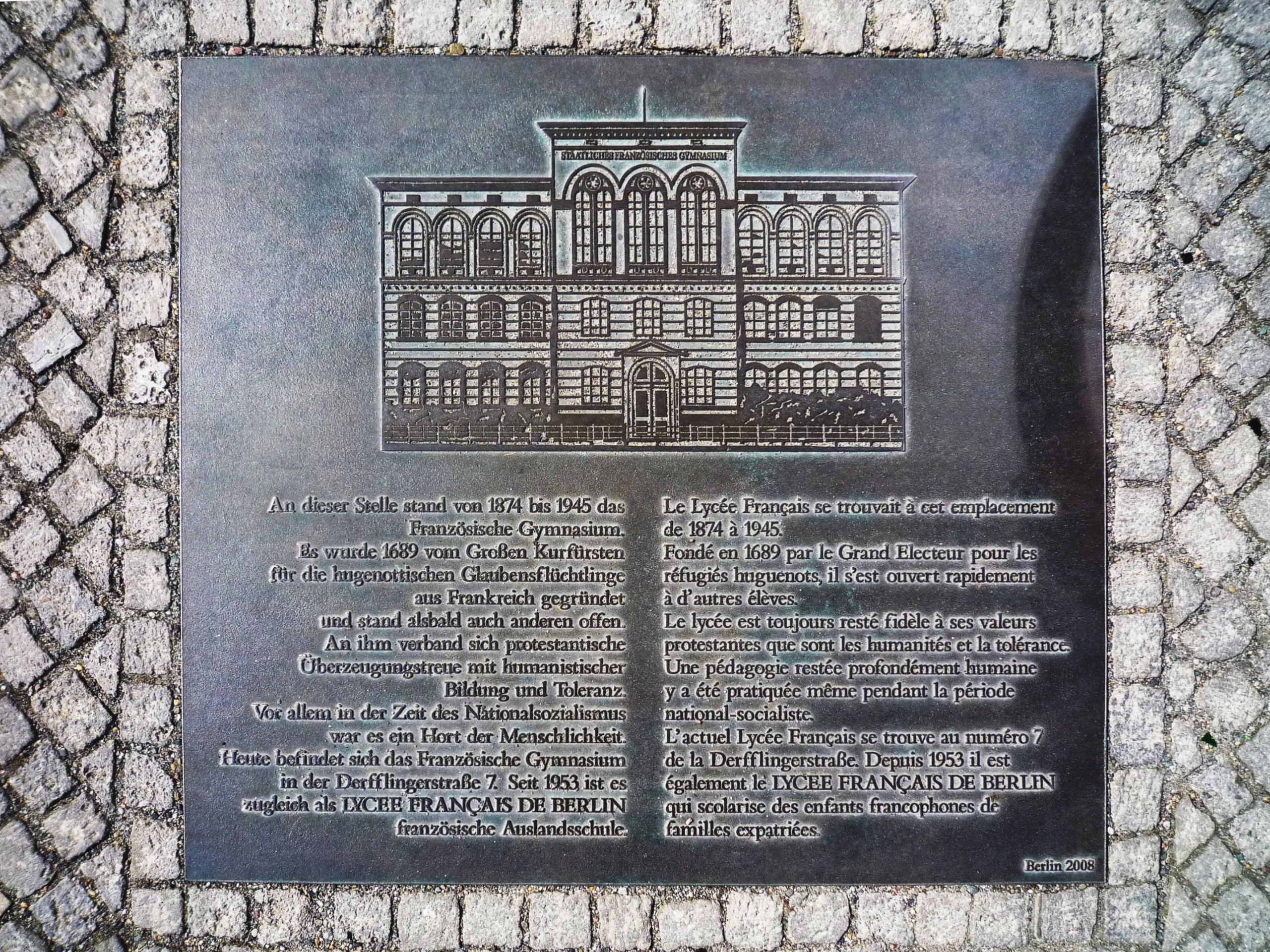
Memorial plaque at the former site on Reichstagsufer

== Notable people ==
=== Faculty and staff ===
- Charles Ancillon (1659–1715), jurist and diplomat
- Paul Erman (1764–1851), physicist
- Georg Adolf Erman (1806–1877), physicist
- Ernst Curtius (1814–1896), archaeologist and historian
- Alfred Clebsch (1833–1872), mathematician
- Hermann Wilhelm Ebel (1820–1875), philologist
- Karl Ploetz (1819–1881), author

=== Alumni ===
- Johann Heinrich Samuel Formey (1711–1797), essayist and philosopher
- Louis de Beausobre (1730–1783), philosopher and political economist
- Ludwig Robert (1778–1832), writer
- Adelbert von Chamisso (1781–1838), poet and botanist
- Franz von Gaudy (1800–1840), poet and novelist
- Karl Ludwig Michelet (1801–1893), philosopher
- Heinrich Girard (1814–1878), mineralist and geologist
- Emil du Bois-Reymond (1818–1896), physician and physiologist
- Carl Bolle (1821–1909), naturalist and collector
- Max von Brandt (1835–1920), diplomat, East Asia expert and publicist
- Petre P. Carp (1837–1919), politician and culture critic
- Gustav Mützel (1839–1893), artist
- Paul Güssfeldt (1840–1920), geologist, mountaineer and explorer
- Alfred Woltmann (1841–1880), art historian
- Ernst von Wildenbruch (1845–1909), poet and dramatist
- Albert Moritz Wolff (1854–1923), sculptor
- Adolf Erman (1854–1937), Egyptologist
- Richard Witting (1856–1923), politician and financier
- Maximilian Harden (1861–1927), journalist and editor
- Paul von Lettow-Vorbeck (1870–1964), general
- Adolf Otto Reinhold Windaus (1876–1959), chemist, Nobel laureate
- Edmund Landau (1877–1938), mathematician
- Victor Klemperer (1881–1960), journalist and literary scholar
- Walther von Brauchitsch (1881–1948), field marshal
- Leonard Nelson (1882–1927), mathematician and philosopher
- Kurt Tucholsky (1890–1935), journalist and writer
- Erich Auerbach (1892–1957), philologist and literary scholar
- Wolfgang G. Friedmann (1907–1972), legal philosopher, academic and humanist
- Adam von Trott zu Solz (1909–1944), lawyer, diplomat and resistance fighter
- Joachim Werner (1909–1994), archaeologist
- Wernher von Braun (1912–1977), rocket scientist
- Gottfried Reinhardt (1913–1994), film producer and director
- Albert O. Hirschman (1915-2012), economist
- Klemens von Klemperer (1916-2012), historian
- Magnus von Braun (1919–2003), rocket engineer
- Ken Adam (born 1921), film designer
- John Leonard Clive (1924–1990), historian
- Wolfgang Gewalt (1928–2007), zoologist
- Reinhard Mey (born 1942), singer-songwriter
- Gesine Schwan (born 1943), political science professor
- Ulrich Roski (1944–2003), singer-songwriter
- Dominique Horwitz (born 1957), actor and singer
- Christian Berkel (born 1957), actor
- Peter Fox (born 1971), musician
- Alexander Schnell (born 1971), philosopher
- Alexandra Maria Lara (born 1978), actress

== See also ==
- Evangelisches Gymnasium zum Grauen Kloster
- Canisius-Kolleg Berlin
- Education in Germany
- La Gazette de Berlin

German international schools in France

- Internationale Deutsche Schule Paris
- DFG / LFA Buc
- Deutsche Schule Toulouse
