= Fritzschia =

Scientific classification
- Kingdom: Plantae
- Clade: Embryophytes
- Clade: Tracheophytes
- Clade: Angiosperms
- Clade: Eudicots
- Clade: Rosids
- Order: Myrtales
- Family: Melastomataceae
- Genus: Fritzschia; Cham.

Species
- See text.

Genus of flowering plants

Fritzschia is a genus of flowering plants in the family Melastomataceae, native to the Atlantic coastal forest of Brazil. They are sprawling or erect shrubs, with their branchlets and their hypanthia coated with either glandular or villose trichomes.

== Species ==
Species accepted by Plants of the World Online as of June 2020 were:

- Fritzschia anisostemon Cham.
- Fritzschia furnensis R.Romero & M.J.Rocha
- Fritzschia erecta Cham.
- Fritzschia integrifolia Cham.

Other species in Fritzschia may include:

- Fritzschia almedae A.B.Martins
- Fritzschia atropurpurea D.Nunes, M.J.R.Rocha & P.J.F.Guim.
- Fritzschia cordifolia R.Romero, D.Nunes & M.J.R.Rocha
- Fritzschia edmundoi (Brade) M.J.R.Rocha & P.J.F.Guim.
- Fritzschia lanceiflora (DC.) M.J.R.Rocha & P.J.F.Guim.
- Fritzschia recubans Glaz.
- Fritzschia rupestris R.Pacifico, Almeda & D.Nunes
- Fritzschia sertularia (DC.) M.J.Rocha & P.J.F.Guim..
- Fritzschia sessilis (Spreng.) M.J.Rocha & P.J.F.Guim.
- Fritzschia stenodon (Naudin) M.J.Rocha & P.J.F.Guim.
