= Johann Heinrich Samuel Formey =

German churchman, educator, author and journalist (1711–1797)

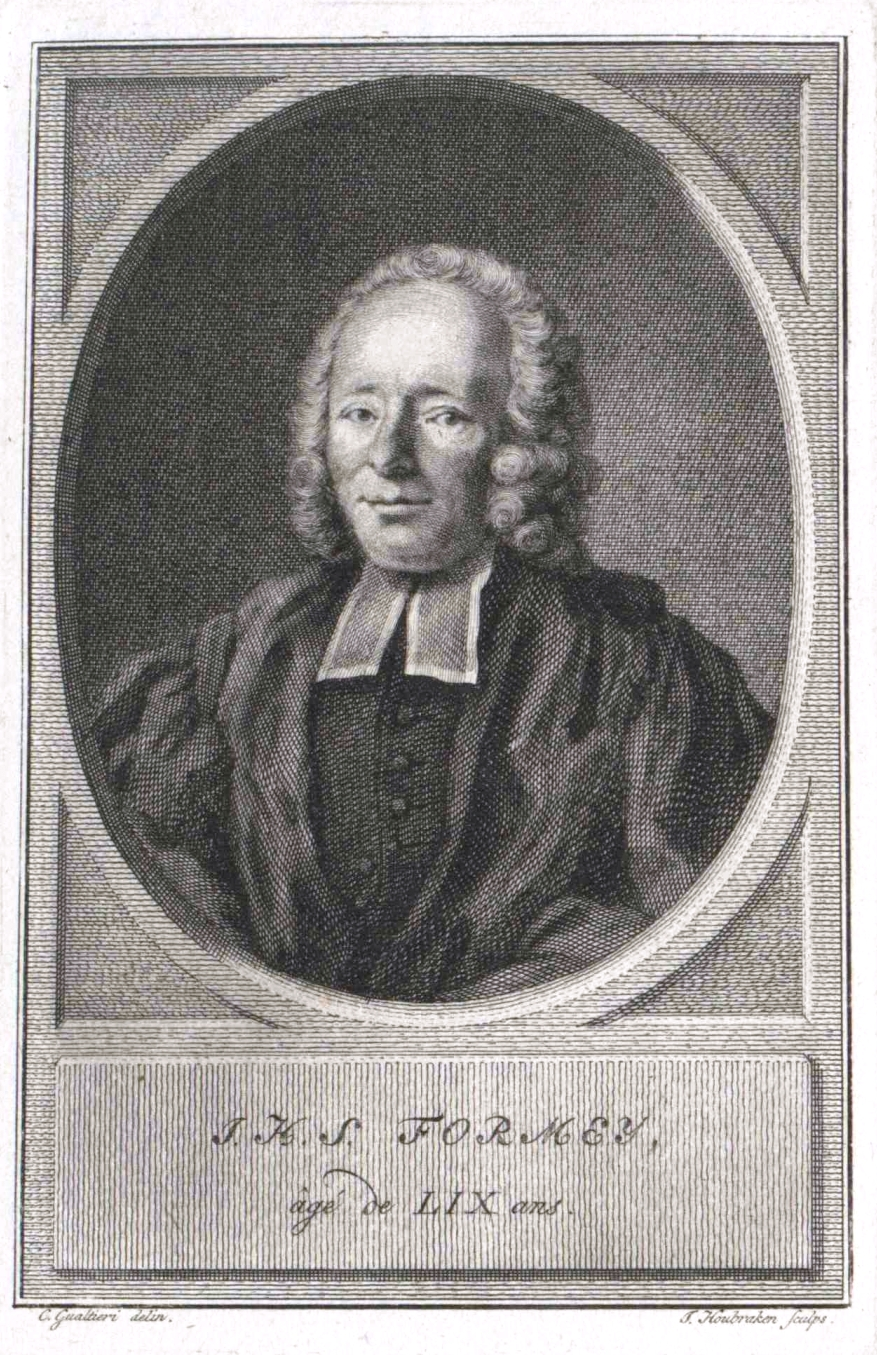
Johann Heinrich Samuel Formey.

Johann Heinrich Samuel Formey (French: Jean Henri Samuel Formey; 31 May 1711 – 7 March 1797) was a German churchman, educator, author, and journalist. The son of an immigrant French family, he preached, taught, and wrote in French. A founding member of the Berlin Academy, he wrote thousands of letters, popularized scientific and philosophical ideas, and also contributed to Diderot's Encyclopédie.

== Life ==
Formey was born in Berlin, Brandenburg, as the son of refugee Huguenots. His mother died when he was three years old, and Samuel was brought up by two of his aunts. He was educated for the ministry, and at the age of twenty became pastor of the French Protestant church at Brandenburg. Having in 1736 accepted the invitation of a congregation in Berlin, he was in the following year chosen professor of rhetoric in the Collège Français there, and in 1739 professor of philosophy. His pupils included Louis de Beausobre, who was to become a philosopher and political economist of some standing in his own right.

On the reorganisation of the Academy of Berlin in 1744, during Frederick the Great's reign, Formey was named a member, and in 1748 its perpetual secretary. The language between the scientists of the Academy, Latin, was changed into French. In 1750 he was appointed as a member of the Royal Society.

Between 1741 and 1753, successive publishers in The Hague brought out the six volumes of Formey's La belle Wolfienne, which was his effort to explain the philosophy of Christian Wolff to women. This series began as a popularisation of Wolff's philosophy in the form of a philosophical romance, but by the end of the 4th volume, Formey abandoned fiction for a paraphrase and abridgement of Wolff's metaphysical works. These books made Wolff more known in France.

Formey wrote during his life more than 17,000 letters, and corresponded several years with Francesco Algarotti, who in 1737 had published a book on Newtonianism for ladies. L'Anti-Sans-Souci, où la folie des Nouveaux philosophes (1760), which denied Frederick's authorship of the Oeuvres and stressed the king's piety is attributed to Formey, who did write the preface.

== Works ==
Formey's principal works are La belle Wolfienne (1741–1753); Le Philosophe chrétien (1740); L'Emile chrétien (1764), intended as an answer to the Emile of Rousseau; and Souvenirs d'un citoyen (Berlin, 1789). He also published an immense number of contemporary memoirs in the transactions of the Berlin Academy. His correspondence with Prosper Marchand was published in 2012.

== Publications ==
An extensive and detailed list of Formey's works can be found in the corresponding article on Formey in the French Wikipedia.

- Le philosophe chrétien, ou discours moraux (1740)
- La belle Wolfienne (6 volumes: 1741–1753)
- Bibliothèque critique, ou memoires pour servir a l'histoire littéraire ancienne et moderne (3 volumes: 1745–1746)
- Essai sur les songes (1746)
- De l’obligation de se procurer toutes les commodités de la vie (1750)
- De la conscience (1751)
- De l’étendue de l’imagination (1754)
- Sur les allégories philosophiques (1755)
- Sur l’origine du langage, des idées et des connaissances humaines (1759)
- Sur le goût (1760)
- Sur les spectacles (1761)
- Sur l’influence de l’âme sur le corps (1764)
- Emile chrétien, consacré à l'utilité publique (1764)
- Considérations sur ce qu’on peut regarder aujourd’hui comme le but principal des académies et comme leur but le plus avantageux (1767–1768)
- Sur la culture de l’entendement (1769)
- Considérations sur l’Encyclopédie française (1770)
- Éloge de J.-B. Boyer, marquis d’Argens (1771)
- Discours sur la question : Pourquoi tant de personnes ont si peu de goût ou même un si grand éloignement pour tout ce qui demande l’exercice des facultés intellectuelles (1772)
- Sur la physiognomie (1775)
- Examen de la question : Si toutes les vérités sont bonnes à dire (1777)
- Sur quelques anciennes procédures contre les magiciens (1778)
- Éloge de Sulzer (1779)
- Éloge de Cochius (1780)
- Éloge de Beguelin (1788–1789)
- Sur les rapports entre le savoir, l’esprit, le génie et le goût (1788–89)
- Souvenirs d'un citoyen (1789)
- Sur le fanatisme (1792–93)
