= Ulrich Roski =

German singer-songwriter

Ulrich Roski (4 March 1944 – 20 February 2003) was a German singer-songwriter and pianist. He achieved his greatest successes in the 1970s.

== Life and career ==
Ulrich Roski was born in Prüm, Rhine Province on 4 March 1944. His father was a school principal and local politician. He developed an interest in performing in school as a teenager, and began writing comedy sketches for high school productions. He studied piano and guitar for six years in his growing up years. He graduated from high school in 1963, and then attended universities in Paris and Berlin. While studying Romance languages and German literature at university he began writing songs.

Roski began his career in the late 1960s performing in cabarets in Germany; displaying a sardonic wit in his material. He made his debut recording with the LP Daß Dich Nicht Die Schweine Beißen (1970, English: That the Pigs Don't Bite You). This was followed by the LP "Das macht mein athletischer Körperbau (English: That's what my athletic physique does), and a successful single: "Der Eimer" (The Bucket).

Roski's songs describe the little quirks hidden in everyone's everyday life, mixing laconic humour with linguistic skill. He produced more than 20 LP's and music CDs since 1970, and some of his songs from this time even made the German Top10, allowing him to perform at the Berliner Philharmonie. He almost exclusively performed alone.

Roski spent his youth in Berlin-Wedding, visiting the Französisches Gymnasium Berlin together with Reinhard Mey, and learning to play the piano and the guitar. In 2002, he published his autobiography, In vollen Zügen. He died in Berlin on 20 February 2003.
