= Isaac de Beausobre =

French churchman

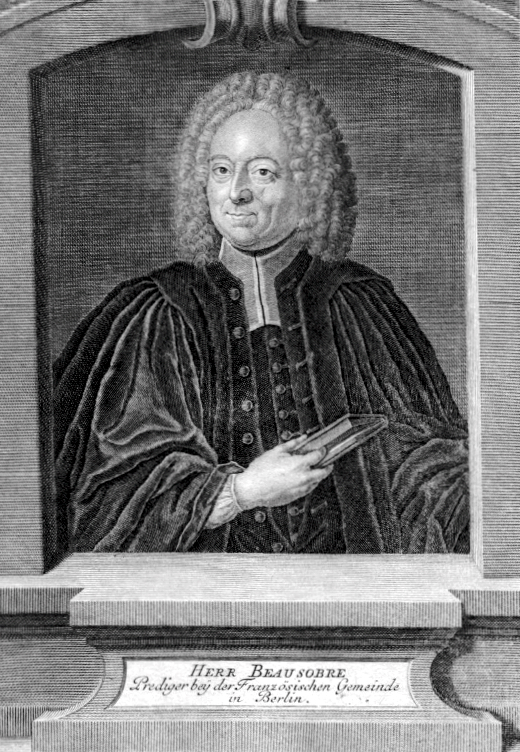
Isaac de Beausobre as preacher to the French community in Berlin

Isaac de Beausobre (8 March 1659 – 5 June 1738) was a French Protestant churchman, now best known for his two-volume history of Manichaeism, Histoire Critique de Manichée et du Manichéisme.

== Life ==
Beausobre was born at Niort, Deux-Sèvres. After studying theology at the Protestant Academy of Saumur, he was ordained at the age of twenty-two, becoming pastor at Châtillon-sur-Indre. After the revocation of the edict of Nantes he fled to Rotterdam (November 1685), and in 1686 was appointed chaplain in Oranienbaum to the princess of Anhalt-Dessau, Henrietta Catherine of Orange-Nassau.

In 1693, on the death of John George II, Prince of Anhalt-Dessau, he went to Berlin and became a court preacher, and in 1695 pastor for the French church at Friedrichswerder Church. He became court preacher, counsellor of the French Reformed Consistory, director of the Maison française, a hospice for French people, inspector of the French gymnasium and superintendent of all the French churches in Brandenburg.

He was a writer of his time and a preacher.

== Family ==
Beausobre was married twice. By his first wife he had a son, Charles Louis de Beausobre (1690–1753), who became a pastor and theologian, and a member of the Prussian Academy of Sciences in Berlin. By his second wife, Charlotte Schwarz, he had another son, Louis de Beausobre (1730–1783), who became a philosopher and political economist, and also a member of the Academy of Sciences.

== Bibliography ==
- Beausobre, Isaac de (1734). Histoire critique de Manichée et du manicheisme. Vol. 1. Amsterdam: J. Frederic Bernard.; 2 (1739)
