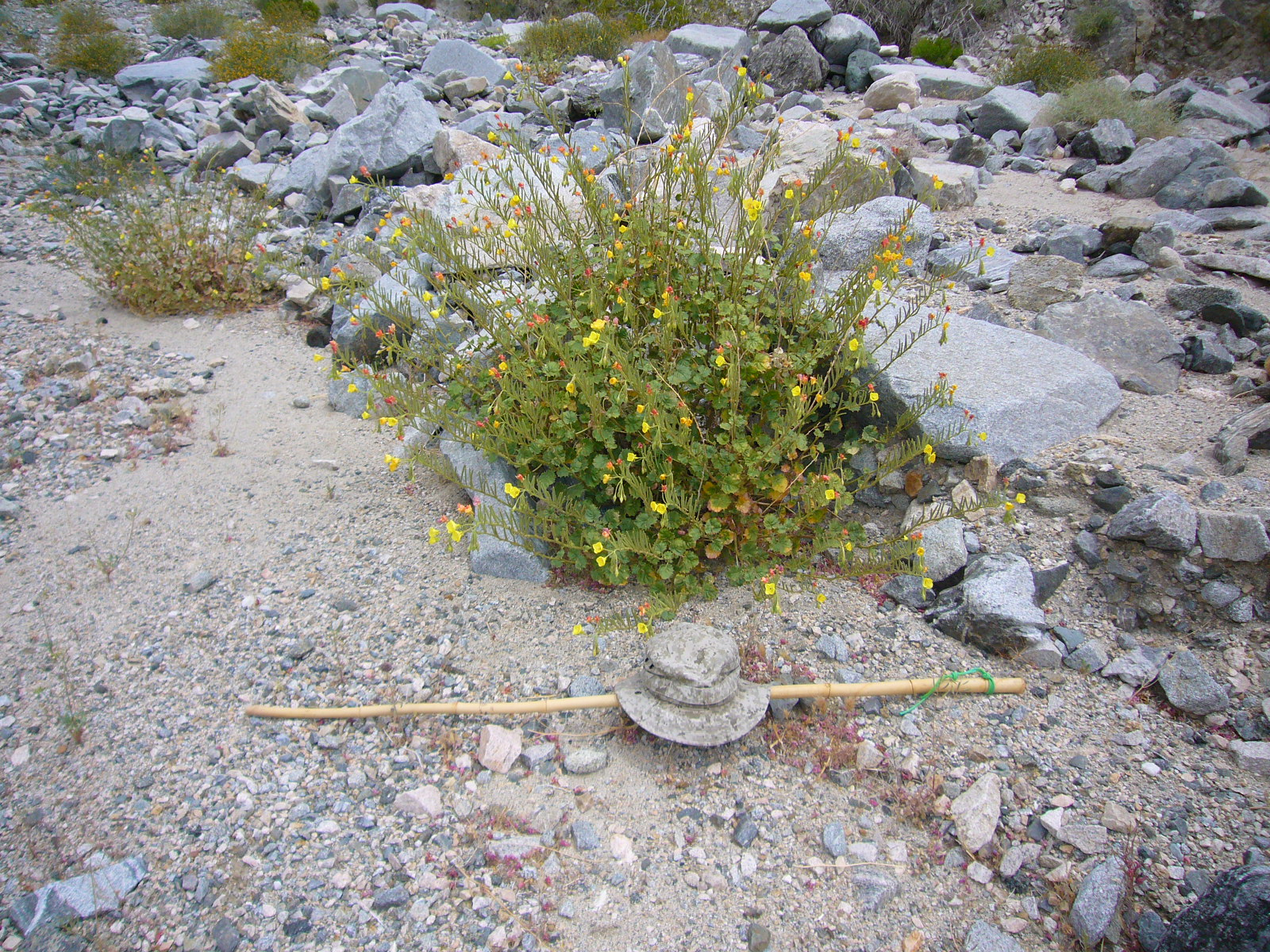

Conservation status
- Vulnerable (NatureServe)

Scientific classification
- Kingdom: Plantae
- Clade: Tracheophytes
- Clade: Angiosperms
- Clade: Eudicots
- Clade: Rosids
- Order: Myrtales
- Family: Onagraceae
- Genus: Chylismia
- Species: C. cardiophylla

Binomial name
- Chylismia cardiophylla (Torr.) Small

Synonyms
- Camissonia cardiophylla (Torr.) P.H.Raven; Oenothera cardiophylla Torr.

= Chylismia cardiophylla =

Species of flowering plant

Chylismia cardiophylla is a species of evening primrose known by the common name heartleaf suncup. It is native to the deserts of northwestern Mexico and the southwestern United States, where it grows in sandy and rocky areas in the desert scrub. It is an annual or perennial herb approaching one meter in maximum height, taking the form of a single erect stem or a low bushy plant. The leaves are up to about 5 centimeters long and are oval or roughly heart-shaped, with rippling or dully toothed edges. The nodding inflorescence is a dense bunch of flowers, each individual cup-shaped bloom on a stout pedicel. The flowers are yellow or cream-colored with petals 3 to 12 millimeters long, and generally remain closed during the day. The fruit is a capsule 2 to 5 centimeters long.
