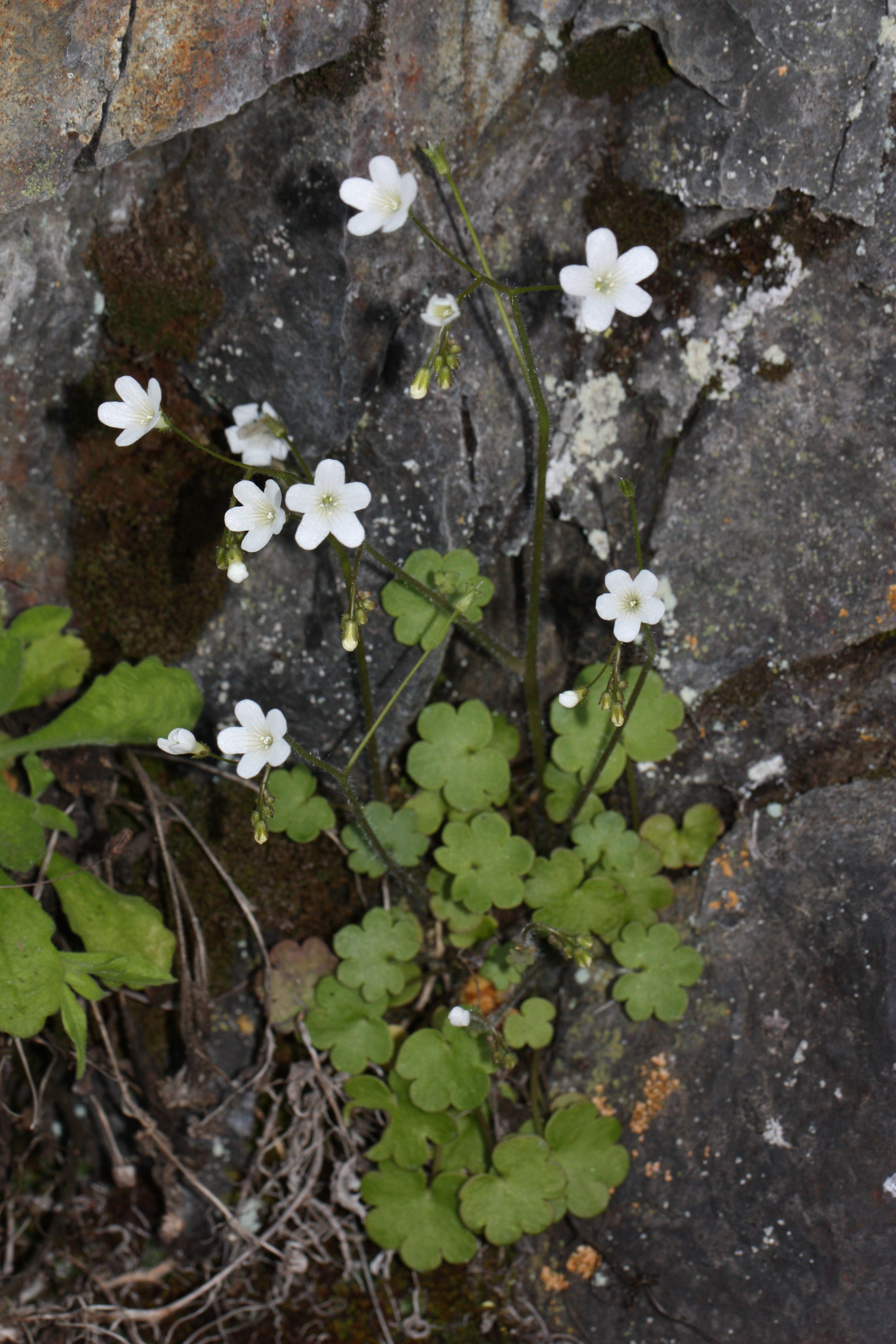
- Romanzoffia sitchensis in John B. Yeon State Scenic Corridor, Oregon

Scientific classification
- Kingdom: Plantae
- Clade: Tracheophytes
- Clade: Angiosperms
- Clade: Eudicots
- Clade: Asterids
- Order: Boraginales
- Family: Hydrophyllaceae
- Genus: Romanzoffia
- Species: R. sitchensis

Binomial name
- Romanzoffia sitchensis Bong.

= Romanzoffia sitchensis =

Species of plant

Romanzoffia sitchensis is a species of flowering plant in the family Hydrophyllaceae. It is known by the common name Sitka mistmaiden. It is native to western North America from Alaska through British Columbia and Alberta to far northern California and Montana.

It grows in moist, rocky habitat, such as mountain cliffsides. It grows erect to 20, or occasionally 30, centimeters tall, the base of the stem widened where the overlapping petioles of the leaves emerge. The leaf blades are somewhat rounded or oval and notched into lobes along the edges.

The inflorescence is a loose, curving or drooping cyme of flowers, each on a small, erect pedicel. The flower has a bell- or funnel-shaped corolla which may just exceed a centimeter long, set in a calyx of narrow, thin sepals. The corolla is white in color, usually with a yellow throat. The fruit is a capsule under a centimeter long.
