= Sivry-Ante =

- Commune
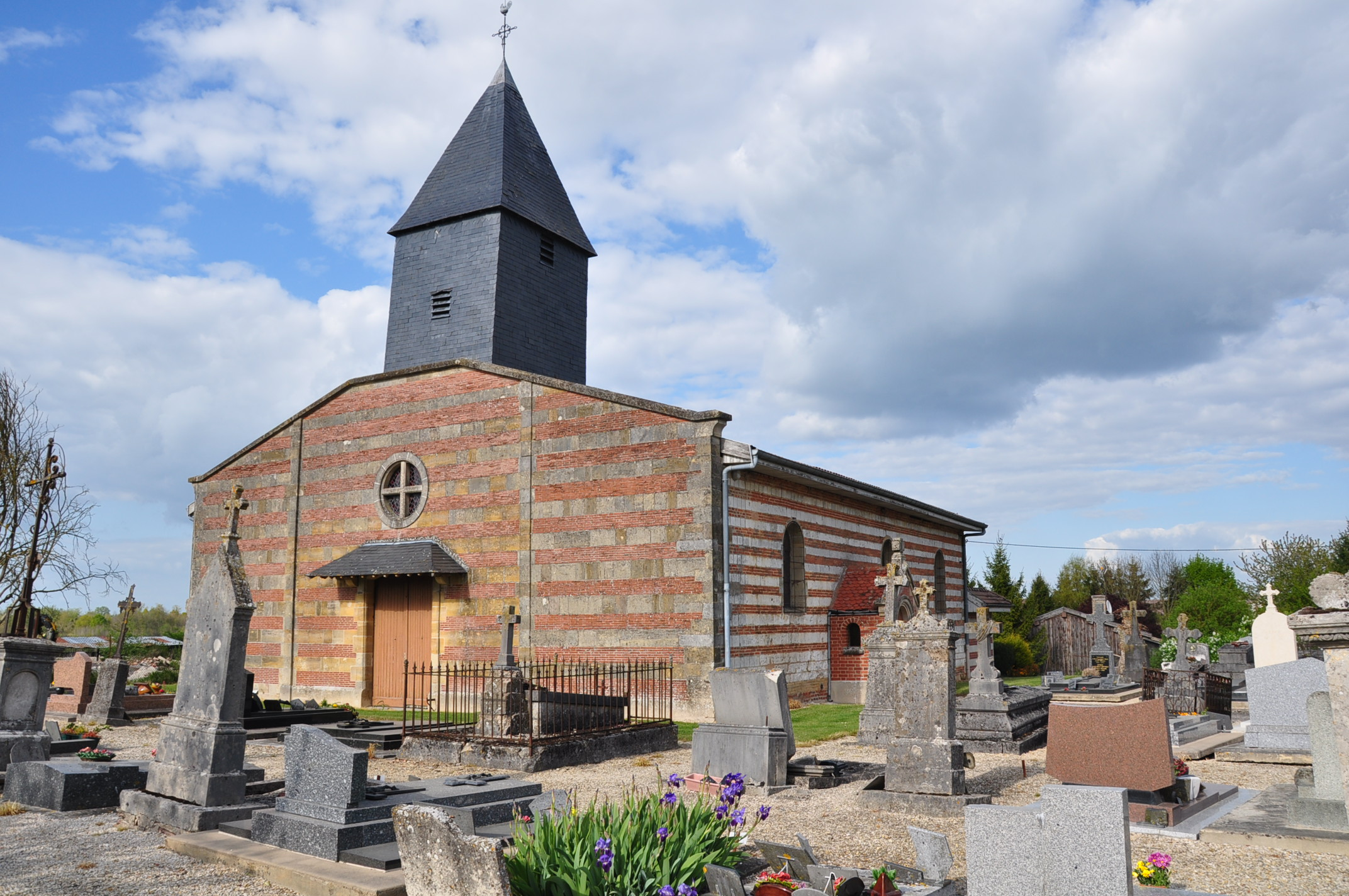
- The church in Sivry
- Location of Sivry-Ante
- Location within France Location within Grand Est
- Coordinates: 49°00′03″N 4°52′11″E
- Country: France
- Region: Grand Est
- Department: Marne
- Arrondissement: Châlons-en-Champagne
- Canton: Argonne Suippe et Vesle
- Intercommunality: Argonne Champenoise

Government
  - Mayor (2020–2026): Bruno Bortolomiol
- Area^{1}: 21.6 km^{2} (8.3 sq mi)
- Elevation: 153 m (502 ft)
- Population (2023): 177
  - Density: 8.19/km^{2} (21.2/sq mi)
- Time zone: UTC+01:00 (CET)
  - Summer (DST): UTC+02:00 (CEST)
- INSEE/Postal code: 51537 /51800
- ^{1} French Land Register data, which excludes lakes, ponds, glaciers > 1 km^{2} (0.386 sq mi or 247 acres) and river estuaries.

Sivry-Ante (French pronunciation: [sivʁi ɑ̃t]) is a commune in the Marne département in north-eastern France. The commune was formed from the combination of two former communes, Ante and Sivry, in 1967.

== Sites and monuments ==
- Boncourt Château, birthplace of Adelbert von Chamisso, the German poet and botanist, was demolished in 1792.

== See also ==
- Communes of the Marne department
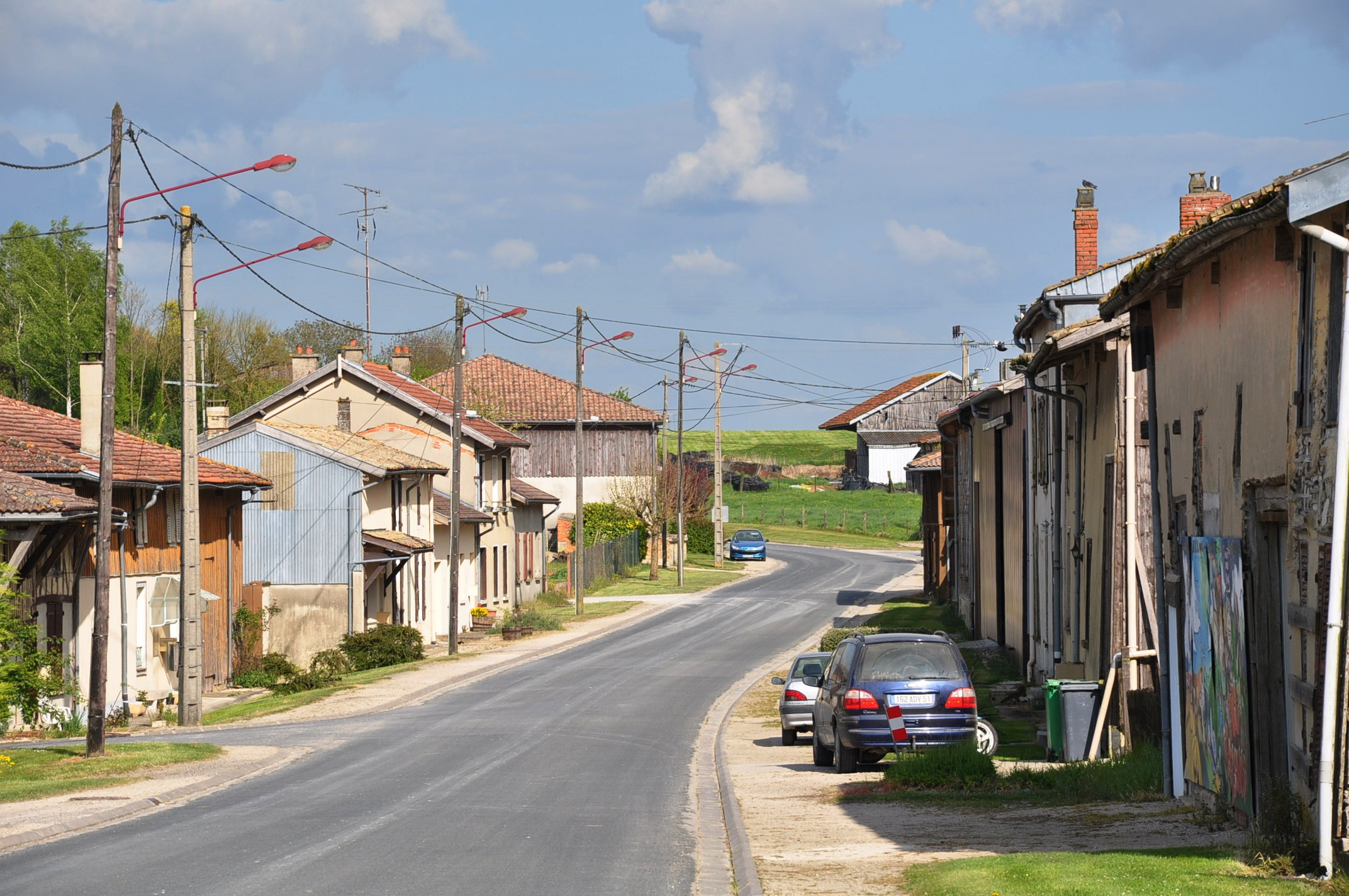
Sivry

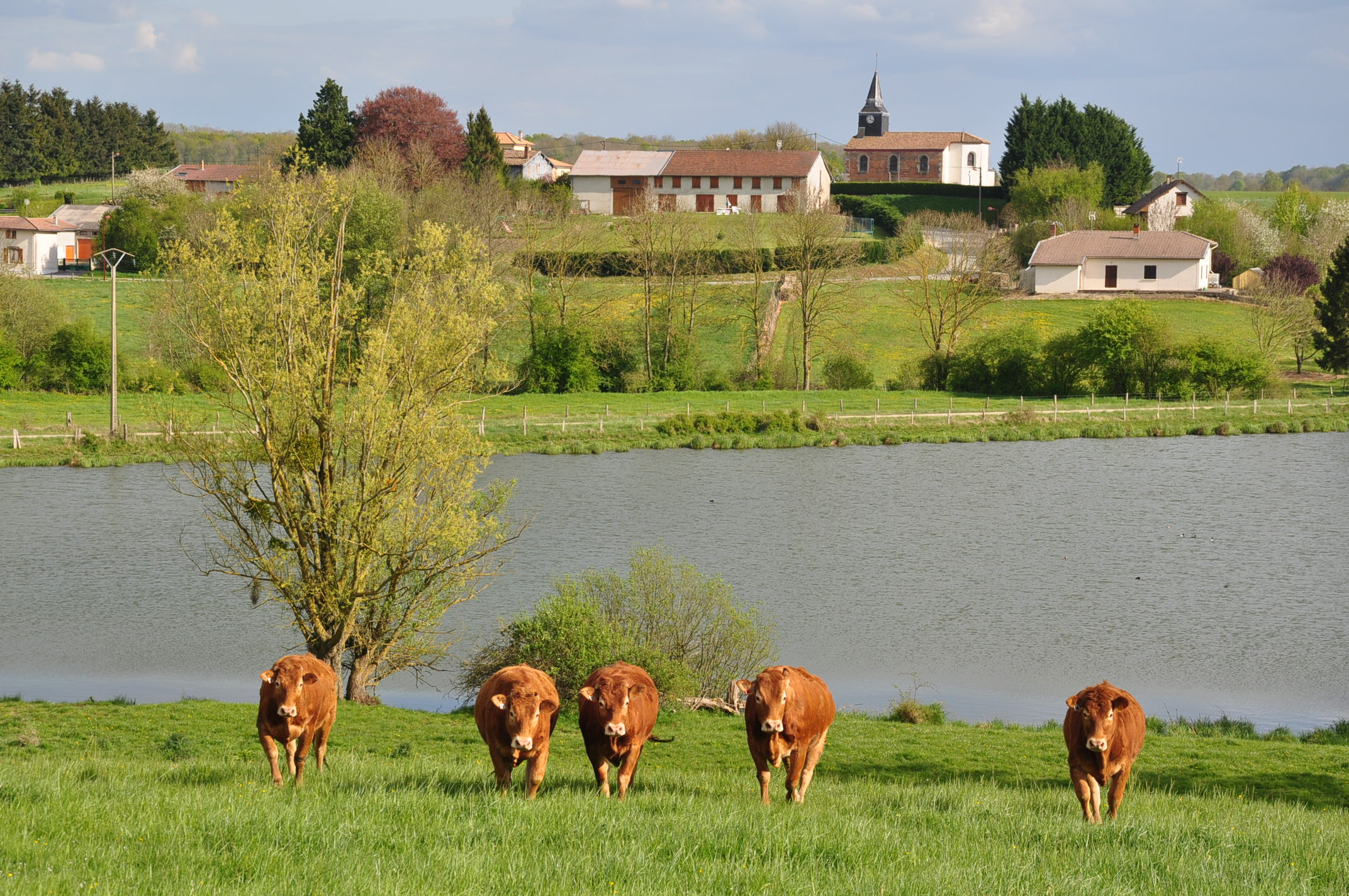
Ante

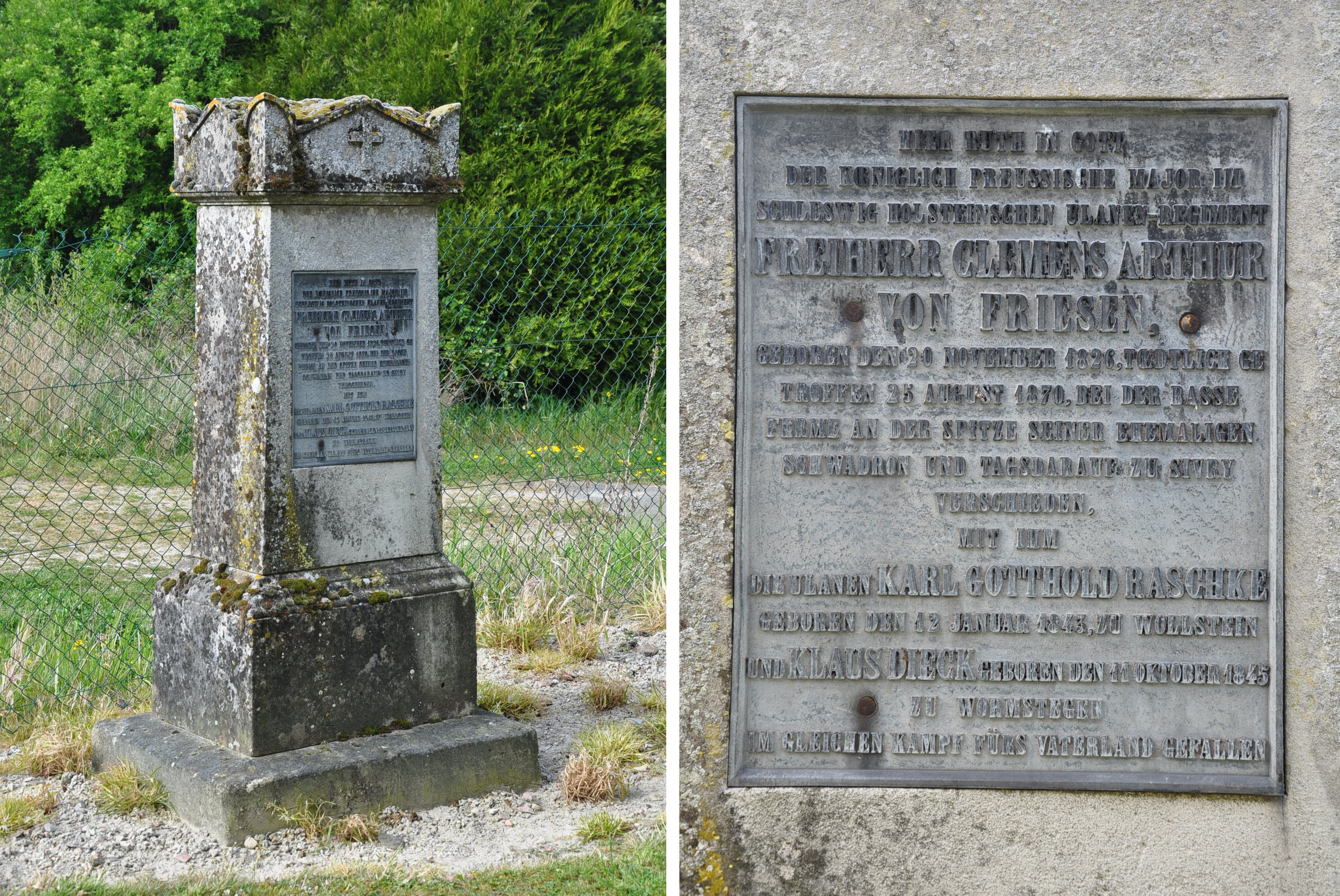
German grave from the Franco-Prussian War (1870) in Sivry
