= Chylismia heterochroma =

Conservation status
- Vulnerable (NatureServe)

Scientific classification
- Kingdom: Plantae
- Clade: Tracheophytes
- Clade: Angiosperms
- Clade: Eudicots
- Clade: Rosids
- Order: Myrtales
- Family: Onagraceae
- Genus: Chylismia
- Species: C. heterochroma

Binomial name
- Chylismia heterochroma (S.Watson) Small

Synonyms
- Camissonia heterochroma (S.Watson) P.H.Raven; Oenothera heterochroma S.Watson

Species of flowering plant

Chylismia heterochroma is a species of evening primrose known by the common name Shockley's evening primrose. It is native to the desert slopes and woodland of eastern California and Nevada. It is a hairy, glandular annual herb growing a spindly stem up to a meter tall. There is a thick basal rosette of leaves which are mostly oval in shape and several centimeters in length, and generally no leaves higher up the stem. The inflorescence produces several small flowers with four oval petals just a few millimeters long and lavender in color with yellow-tinted bases. The fruit is a club-shaped capsule roughly a centimeter long.
