= Franz von Gaudy =

German poet and novelist

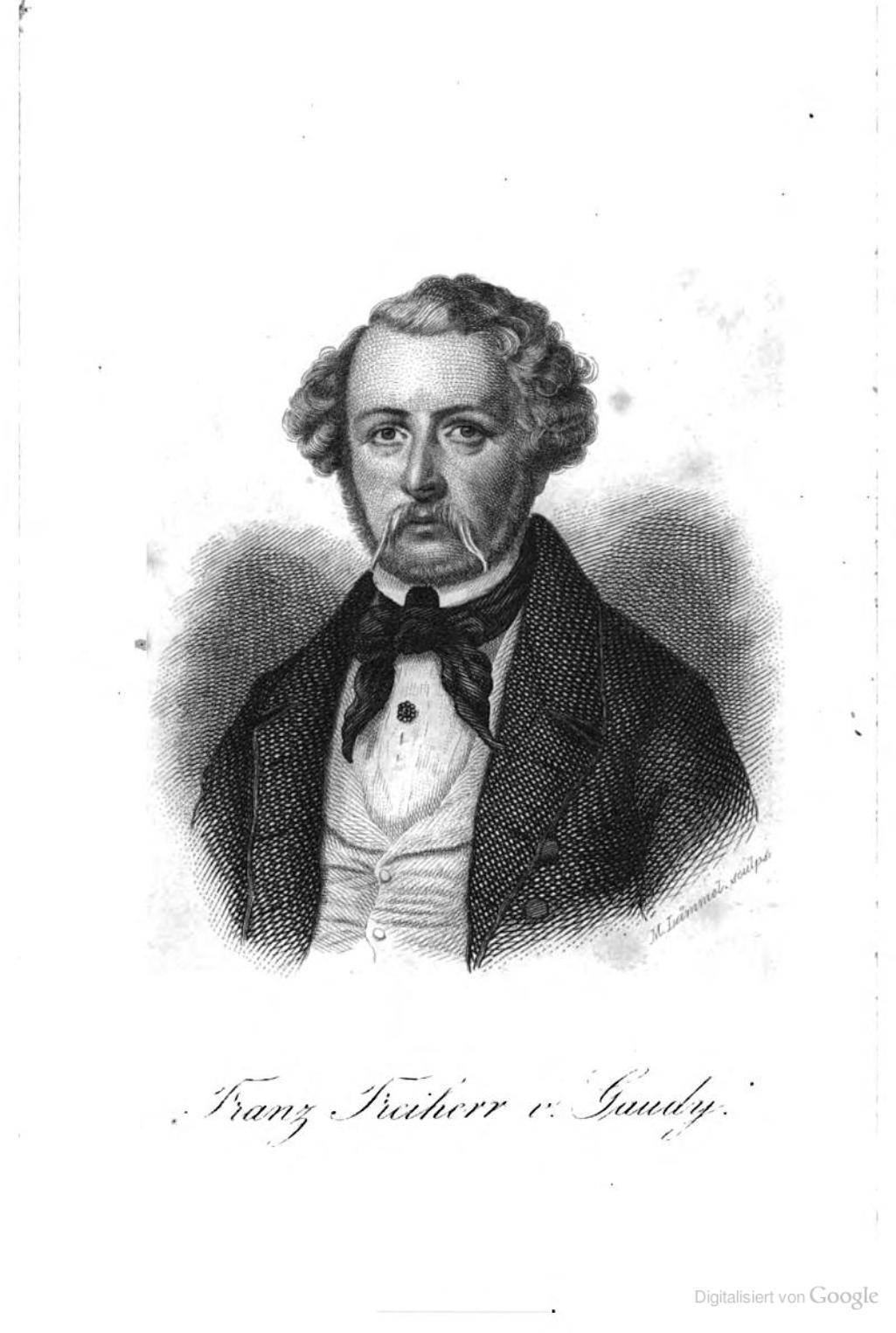
Franz von gaudy

Franz Bernhard Heinrich Wilhelm Freiherr von Gaudy (19 April 1800 Frankfurt (Oder) – 5 February 1840 Berlin) was a German poet and novelist.

His family came from Scotland. He got his education first in the Collège Français in Berlin, then in Schulpforta. In 1818 he entered the Prussian army, but applied for his discharge in 1833 to pursue the life of a free writer. In 1833 and 1835 he traveled to Italy.

In his poems, he first imitated Heinrich Heine, later Pierre-Jean de Béranger. After Gustav Schwabs retirement he was the editor of the Deutscher Musenalmanach(1839) along with Adelbert von Chamisso.

== Works ==
- Erato (1829)
- Kaiserlieder (1835)
- Aus dem Tagebuch eines wandernden Schneidergesellen (1836)
