= Louis de Beausobre =

German philosopher and political economist

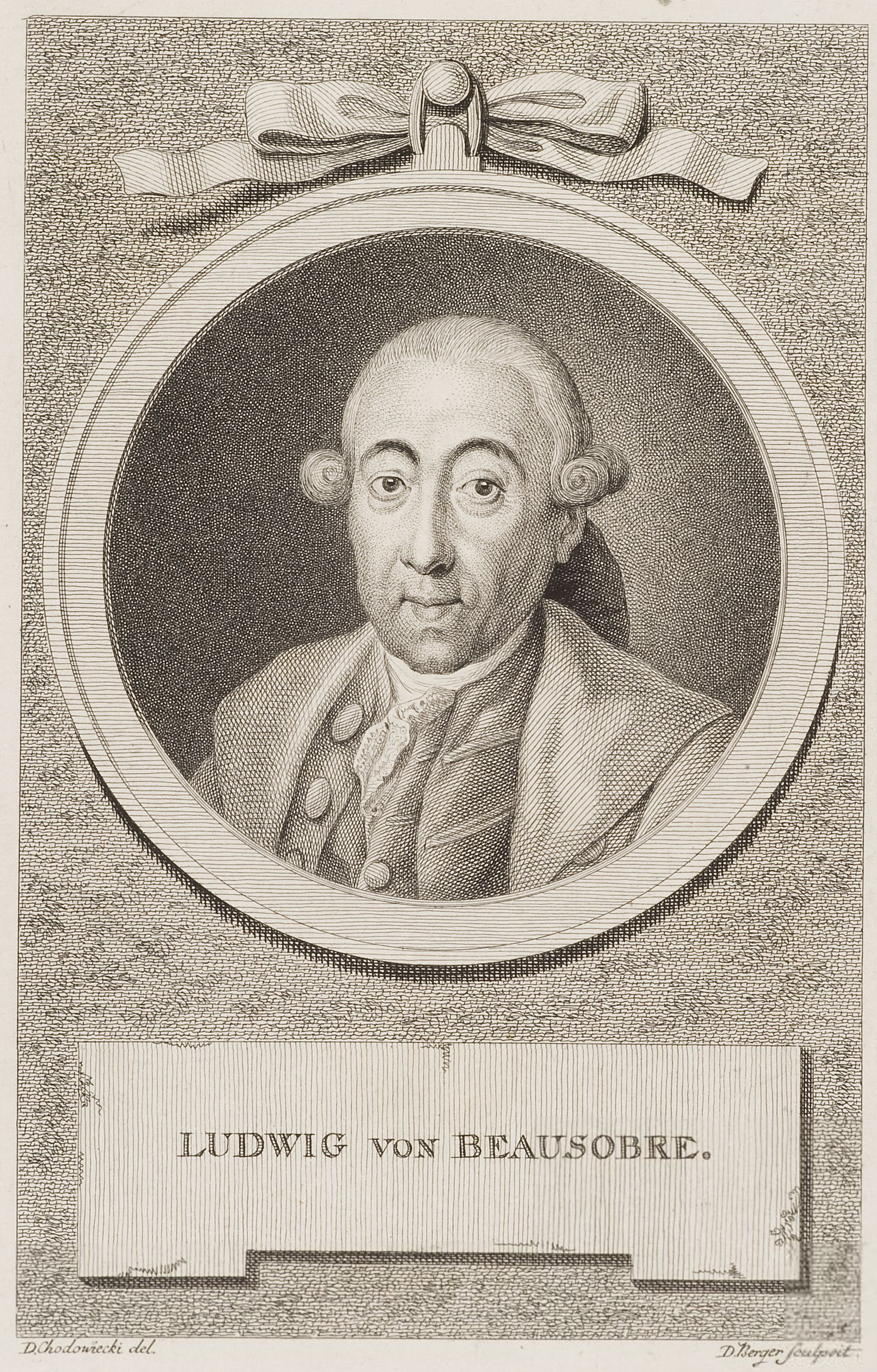
Louis de Beausobre, 1779, by Daniel Nikolaus Chodowiecki

Louis Isaac de Beausobre (19 August 1730 – 3 December 1783) was a German philosopher and political economist of French Huguenot descent. He was born in Berlin, the son of the French Protestant churchman and ecclesiastical historian Isaac de Beausobre and his second wife, Charlotte Schwarz. He is not to be confused with his elder half-brother, the pastor and theologian Charles Louis de Beausobre (1690–1753).

Beausobre was educated at the Collège Français in Berlin, where he was taught and greatly influenced by Johann Heinrich Samuel Formey. He went on to study philosophy at Frankfurt an der Oder, and later in Paris. On his return to Berlin he was received as a member of the Prussian Academy of Sciences in 1755.

Frederick the Great, out of esteem for Isaac de Beausobre, became the guardian of his son Louis de Beausobre, and supported him in his studies.

== Works ==
- Dissertations philosophiques, dont la première roule sur la nature du feu, et la seconde sur les différentes parties de la philosophie et des mathématiques (1753) Online text
- Le Pyrrhonisme du sage (1754)
- Le Pyrrhonisme raisonnable (1755) (a second edition of Le Pyrrhonisme du sage) Online text
- Nouvelles considérations sur les années climatériques, la longueur de la vie de l’homme, la propagation du genre humain, et la vraie puissance des États, considérée dans la plus grande population (1757) Online text
- Essai sur le bonheur, ou Réflexions philosophiques sur les biens et les maux de la vie humaine (1758) Online text
- Introduction générale à l'étude de la politique, des finances et du commerce (1764) Online text
- "Réflexions sur la nature et les causes de la folie", published in 5 parts in Histoire de l'Académie royale des sciences et des belles-lettres for 1759 and 1760 (1766–7)
- "Réflexions sur les songes", published in Histoire de l'Académie royale des sciences et des belles-lettres for 1762 (1769)
- "Sur l'enthusiasme", published in Nouveaux Mémoires de l'Académie royale for 1779 (1781)
