= Romanzoffia tracyi =

Scientific classification
- Kingdom: Plantae
- Clade: Tracheophytes
- Clade: Angiosperms
- Clade: Eudicots
- Clade: Asterids
- Order: Boraginales
- Family: Hydrophyllaceae
- Genus: Romanzoffia
- Species: R. tracyi

Binomial name
- Romanzoffia tracyi Jeps.

Species of plant

Romanzoffia tracyi is a species of flowering plant in the family Hydrophyllaceae. It is known by the common names Tracy's mistmaiden and Tracy's romanzoffia. It is native to the coastline of western North America from far northern California north to the southern tip of Vancouver Island, where it grows among rocks on oceanside bluffs.

It is a tufted plant reaching no more than about 12 centimeters tall, its herbage growing from a network of hairy brown tubers. The leaves have rounded blades notched into lobes along the edges, borne on petioles which may be several centimeters long. The inflorescence is short cyme of funnel-shaped flowers each just under a centimeter long. The flower has a yellow-throated white corolla set in a calyx of narrow, pointed sepals.
