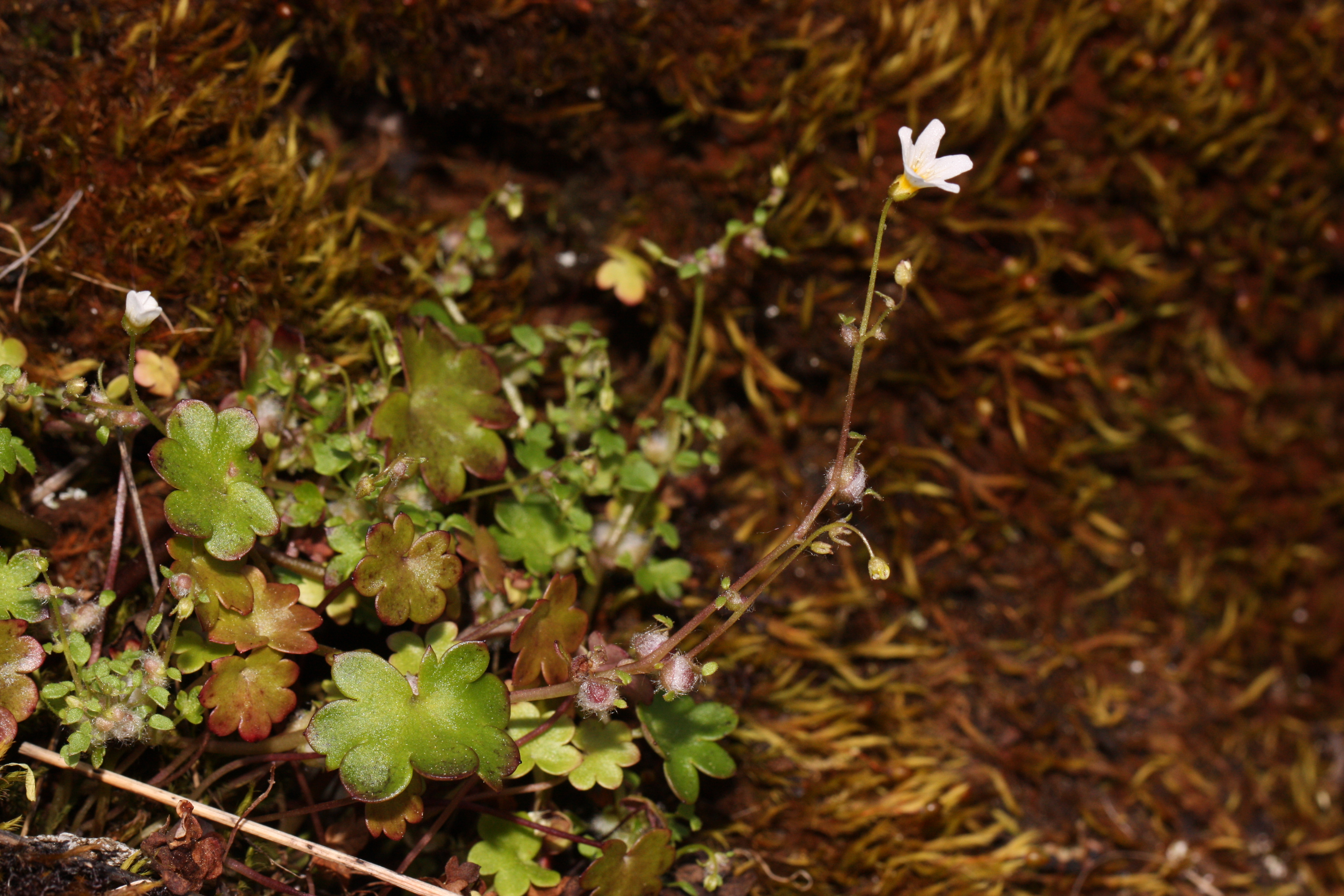

Scientific classification
- Kingdom: Plantae
- Clade: Tracheophytes
- Clade: Angiosperms
- Clade: Eudicots
- Clade: Asterids
- Order: Boraginales
- Family: Hydrophyllaceae
- Genus: Romanzoffia
- Species: R. californica

Binomial name
- Romanzoffia californica Greene

= Romanzoffia californica =

Species of plant

Romanzoffia californica is a species of flowering plant in the family Hydrophyllaceae. It is known by the common name California mistmaiden. It is native to Oregon and northern California, where it grows in moist and wet habitat, such as coastal bluffs and mountain forests.

Romanzoffia californica grows erect to 40 centimeters (16 in) tall from a network of hairy brown tubers. Around the base is a number of leaves with rounded, evenly lobed blades on petioles several centimeters long.

The inflorescence is a curving cyme of flowers, each on a small, erect pedicel. The flower has a funnel-shaped corolla which may just exceed a centimeter long, set in a calyx of pointed sepals. The corolla is white in color with a yellow throat. The fruit is a capsule up to a centimeter long.
