= Alexander Schnell =

German philosopher

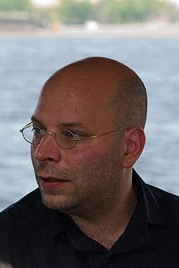

Alexander Schnell is a German philosopher and professor at the University of Wuppertal.

== Biography ==
Alexander Schnell grew up in West Berlin and in Heidelberg. After taking his Abitur and Baccalauréat at the French Gymnasium in Berlin in 1989, he studied engineering at the University Paris 6 and philosophy at the University Paris 1 (where the teachings of Jean-Toussaint Desanti and Marc Richir seem to have influenced him in particular).

After spending several years abroad in Sofia (Bulgaria), where he gained his first teaching experience at the university "St. Kliment Ohridski", he took up a position in Paris as a research associate or assistant. In 2001, he received his doctorate summa cum laude under the supervision of Françoise Dastur on the topic "The Problem of Time in Husserl (1893-1918)". From 2002 to 2007 he taught as "Maitre de Conferences" at the University of Poitiers. The topic of his habilitation was: "Gestalten der Transzendentalphilosophie: Fichte, Schelling, Husserl, Heidegger" (under the supervision of Jean-François Courtine).

Between 2007 and 2016, he was "Maitre de Conferences" at the University of Paris - Sorbonne and at the same time Head of Department of Philosophy at Paris Sorbonne University Abu Dhabi (PSUAD) between 2014 and 2016. Since its foundation (2007), he has been actively involved in the Master's Mundus programme "German and French Philosophy in Europe (EuroPhilosophy)" - among other things, he was head of the intensive seminar at the University of Luxembourg and is chairman of the selection committee at the University of Toulouse-Jean Jaurès. Between 2012 and 2016, he was the responsible director of the research centre "CEPCAP" at the University Paris-Sorbonne. Since 2016, he has been a university professor at the University of Wuppertal Chair of Theoretical Philosophy and Phenomenology). There he directs the Institute for Transcendental Philosophy and Phenomenology (ITP), to which the International Fichte Research Centre (IFF), the Eugen Fink Zentrum Wuppertal (EFZW), the Archive Library Post-New Kantanism and Critical Idealism of the Present (APIG), the Marc Richir Archive (MRA), the Archive for Phenomenological Research (APF) and the Centre for Principle Research (ZePF) are affiliated. He is president of the Association Internationale de Phénoménologie (A.I.P.).

Alexander Schnell has lectured regularly at the University of Paris-Sorbonne Abu Dhabi and has been a visiting professor at the University of Memphis (USA), Hōsei University (Tokyo, Japan) and University of Freiburg.

== Research work ==
Alexander Schnell's research ranges from Classical German Philosophy to German and French Phenomenology. He is considered a pioneer of a renewed phenomenology understood as transcendental idealism, which revives Husserl's project of a phenomenology of knowledge. Alexander Schnell's early work was historiographically oriented. He edited monographs on Husserl, Heidegger, Levinas and Richir. Since completing his habilitation (2008), he has devoted himself - among other things, in the debate with the "speculative realism" of Quentin Meillassoux - to the elaboration of his own position, which goes by the name of "generative phenomenology". This brings metaphysical and anthropological questions into focus. Whether his approaches to a phenomenological metaphysics can still be understood as "phenomenology" is disputed.

He writes his works in German and in French. Several works are available in Chinese, Italian and Romanian translation.
