= Boncourt, Aisne =

Boncourt
- Commune
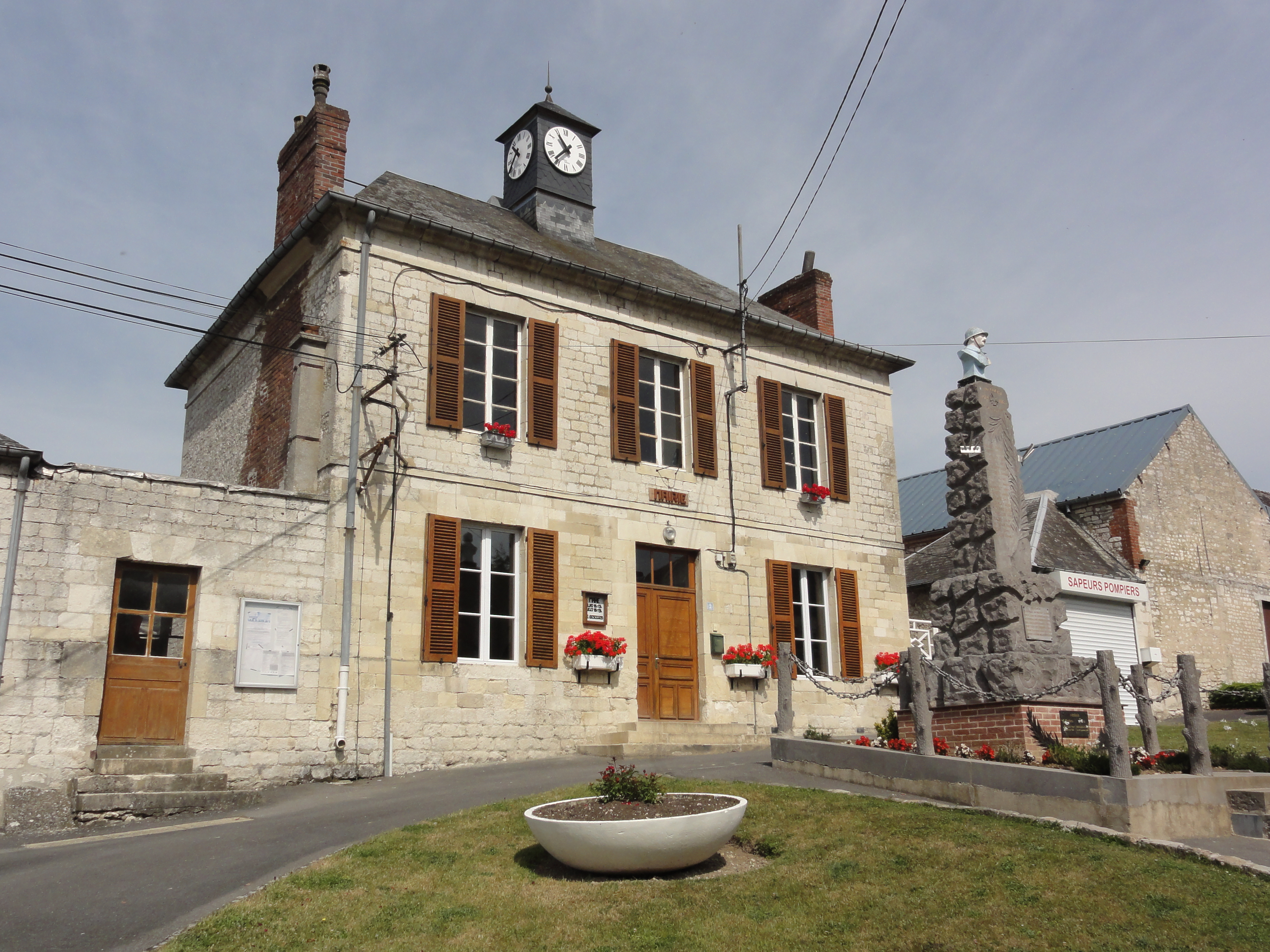
- The town hall of Boncourt

- Coat of arms
- Location of Boncourt
- Location within France Location within Hauts-de-France
- Coordinates: 49°37′01″N 3°56′46″E
- Country: France
- Region: Hauts-de-France
- Department: Aisne
- Arrondissement: Laon
- Canton: Villeneuve-sur-Aisne
- Intercommunality: Champagne Picarde

Government
  - Mayor (2026–32): Régine Redmer
- Area^{1}: 13.29 km^{2} (5.13 sq mi)
- Elevation: 85 m (279 ft)
- Highest elevation: 137 m (449 ft)
- Lowest elevation: 82 m (269 ft)
- Population (2023): 272
  - Density: 20.5/km^{2} (53.0/sq mi)
- Time zone: UTC+01:00 (CET)
  - Summer (DST): UTC+02:00 (CEST)
- INSEE/Postal code: 02097 /02350
- ^{1} French Land Register data, which excludes lakes, ponds, glaciers > 1 km^{2} (0.386 sq mi or 247 acres) and river estuaries.

Boncourt (French pronunciation: [bɔ̃kuʁ]) is a commune in the department of Aisne in Hauts-de-France in northern France.

== Population ==
Historical population
Year	Pop.	±% p.a.
1968	290	—
1975	233	−3.08%
1982	232	−0.06%
1990	237	+0.27%
1999	225	−0.58%
2007	236	+0.60%
2012	254	+1.48%
2017	259	+0.39%
2023	272	+0.82%
Source: INSEE

== See also ==
- Communes of the Aisne department
