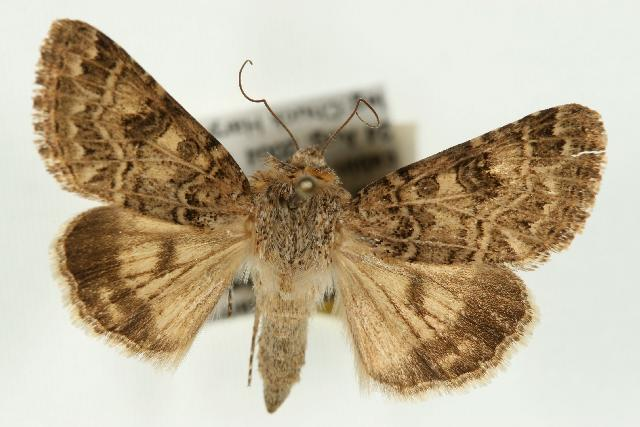

Scientific classification
- Domain: Eukaryota
- Kingdom: Animalia
- Phylum: Arthropoda
- Class: Insecta
- Order: Lepidoptera
- Superfamily: Noctuoidea
- Family: Noctuidae
- Genus: Schinia
- Species: S. cupes

Binomial name
- Schinia cupes Grote, 1875

Synonyms
- Heliothis cupes Grote, 1875; Trichosellus cupes Grote, 1890; Schinia navarra Dyar, 1914; Trichosellus navarra McDunnough, 1938

= Schinia cupes =

Species of moth

Schinia cupes is a moth of the family Noctuidae. It is found from Texas, west to New Mexico and north to Kansas and Colorado.

The wingspan is about 30 mm. Adults are on wing from March to June. There is a second smaller generation flying from late-July to September.

The larvae feed on Camissonia claviformis and Castilleja exserta.
