= Heinrich Girard =

German mineralogist and geologist

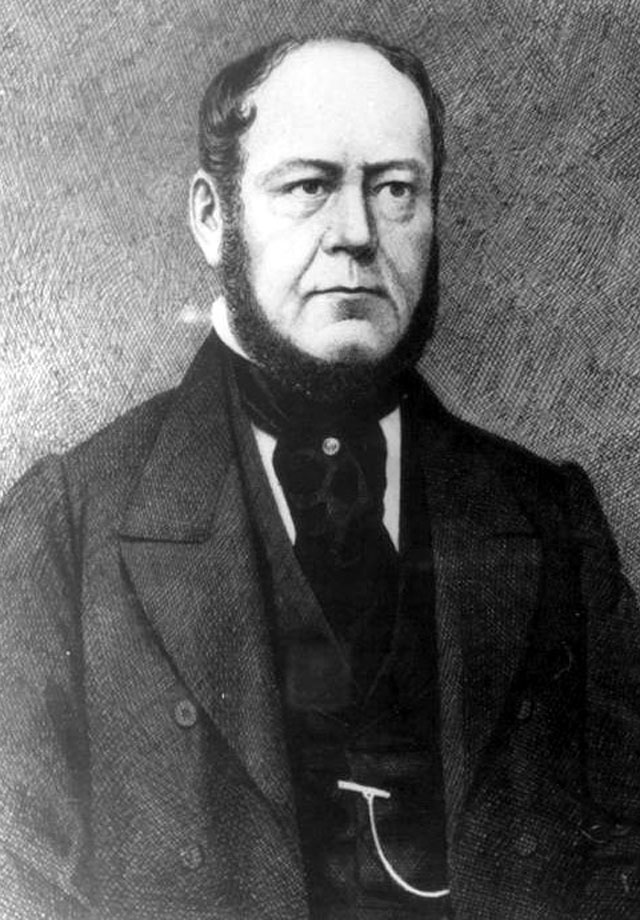
Heinrich Girard.

Heinrich Girard (2 June 1814 – 11 April 1878) was a German mineralogist and geologist born in Berlin.

He studied natural sciences in Berlin, receiving his habilitation in 1845. Afterwards he became an associate professor of mineralogy and geology at the University of Marburg, and in 1854 a full professor at the University of Halle. In 1863/64 he was rector at the university.

Girard was the author of an 1862 textbook on mineralogy, and was editor of the fourth volume of Briefe über Alexander von Humboldts Kosmos ("Epistles on Alexander von Humboldt's Kosmos").

== Selected publications ==
- Geognostische Untersuchungen in der norddeutschen Tiefebene (Geognostic investigations in the North German Plain); magazine, (1845).
- Ueber Erdbeben und Vulkane (On earthquakes and volcanos), (1845).
- Geologische Wanderungen (Geological excursions), (1855).
- Handbuch der Mineralogie (Textbook of mineralogy), (1862).
- Grundlagen der Bodenkunde für Land- und Forstwirte (Fundamentals of soil science for farmers and foresters), 1868).
