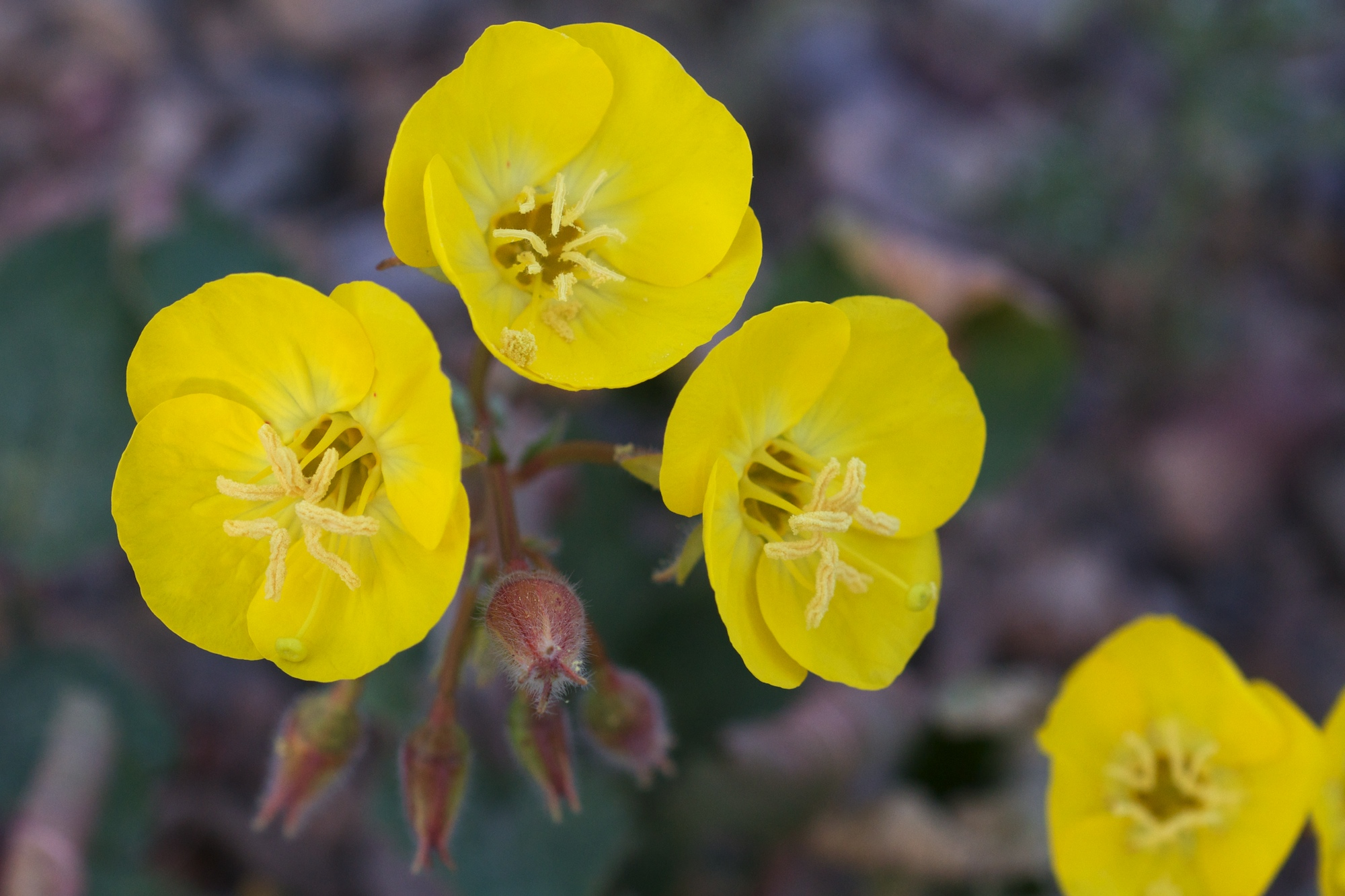

Scientific classification
- Kingdom: Plantae
- Clade: Tracheophytes
- Clade: Angiosperms
- Clade: Eudicots
- Clade: Rosids
- Order: Myrtales
- Family: Onagraceae
- Genus: Chylismia
- Species: C. brevipes

Binomial name
- Chylismia brevipes (A.Gray) Small

Synonyms
- Camissonia brevipes (A.Gray) P.H.Raven; Oenothera brevipes A.Gray

= Chylismia brevipes =

Species of flowering plant

Chylismia brevipes is a species of wildflower native to the American desert southwest known by the common names yellow cups, Mojave suncup, and golden suncup. This is a hairy annual with tall stems often reaching over half a meter in height and surrounded by basal leaves which may be simple or composed of several leaflets. It produces an inflorescence which has one to several blooms in it. The flowers are bright yellow, often with reddish speckling at the base of each petal. The center of the flower has a long pistil and several shorter stamens with large anthers. The fruits are hanging capsules which may be several centimeters long.
