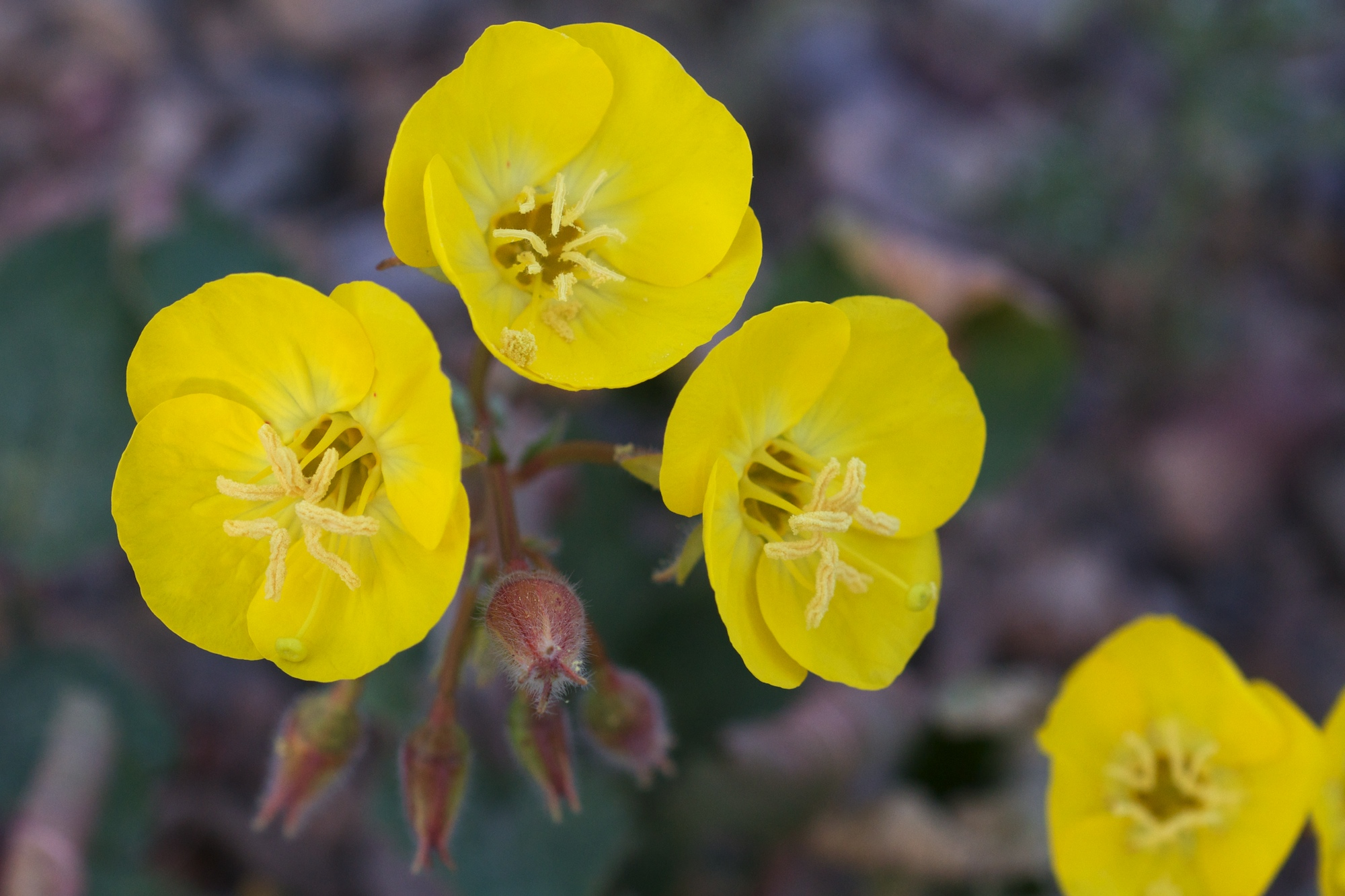
- Chylismia brevipes

Scientific classification
- Kingdom: Plantae
- Clade: Tracheophytes
- Clade: Angiosperms
- Clade: Eudicots
- Clade: Rosids
- Order: Myrtales
- Family: Onagraceae
- Subfamily: Onagroideae
- Tribe: Onagreae
- Genus: Chylismia (Torr. & A.Gray) Nutt. ex Raim.

= Chylismia =

Genus of flowering plants

Chylismia is a plant genus in the evening primrose family Onagraceae.

== Species ==
The Plant List recognises 16 accepted species:

- Chylismia arenaria A.Nelson
- Chylismia atwoodii (Cronquist) W.L.Wagner & Hoch
- Chylismia brevipes (A.Gray) Small
- Chylismia cardiophylla (Torr.) Small
- Chylismia claviformis (Torr. & Frém.) A.Heller
- Chylismia confertiflora (P.H.Raven) W.L.Wagner & Hoch
- Chylismia eastwoodiae (Munz) W.L.Wagner & Hoch
- Chylismia exilis (P.H.Raven) W.L.Wagner & Hoch
- Chylismia heterochroma (S.Watson) Small
- Chylismia megalantha (Munz) W.L.Wagner & Hoch
- Chylismia multijuga (S.Watson) Small
- Chylismia munzii (P.H.Raven) W.L.Wagner & Hoch
- Chylismia parryi (S.Watson) Small
- Chylismia scapoidea (Torr. & A.Gray) Small
- Chylismia specicola (P.H.Raven) W.L.Wagner & Hoch
- Chylismia walkeri A.Nelson
