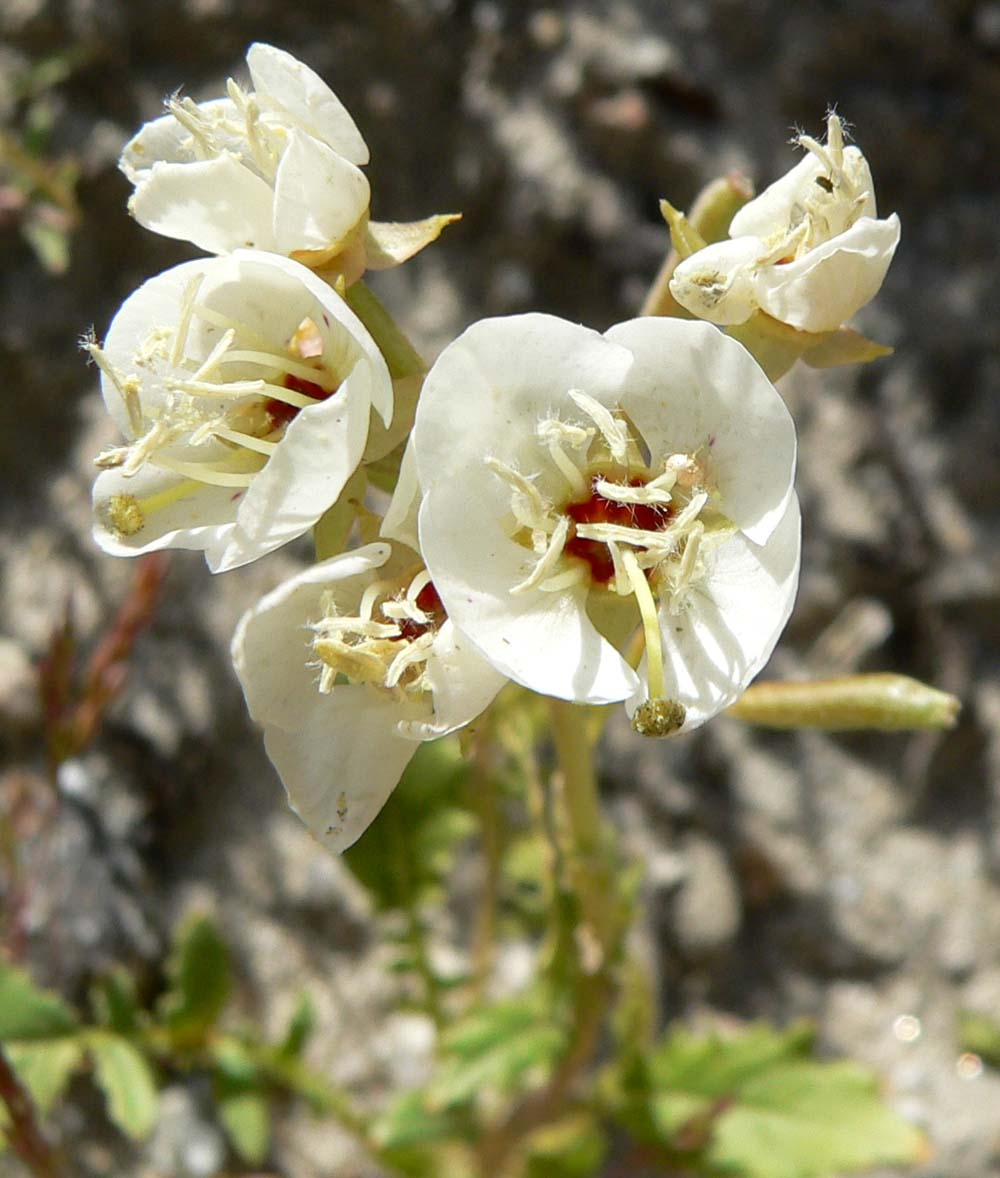

Conservation status
- Secure (NatureServe)

Scientific classification
- Kingdom: Plantae
- Clade: Tracheophytes
- Clade: Angiosperms
- Clade: Eudicots
- Clade: Rosids
- Order: Myrtales
- Family: Onagraceae
- Genus: Chylismia
- Species: C. claviformis

Binomial name
- Chylismia claviformis (Torr. & Frém.) A.Heller

Synonyms
- Camissonia claviformis (Torr. & Frém.) P.H.Raven; Oenothera claviformis Torr. & Frém.

= Chylismia claviformis =

Species of wildflower

Chylismia claviformis is a species of wildflower known as browneyes or brown-eyed primrose native to North America. This species is found across western North America from the Pacific Northwest to northern Mexico.

== Description ==
It is an annual plant growing from a basal rosette of long oval leaves and producing stems often exceeding half a meter in height. Atop the stem is an inflorescence of one to many primrose blooms, each with four white or yellow petals. The pistil may be quite long and has a bulbous stigma at the tip. The stamens are somewhat shorter and they bear long hairy anthers containing white or yellow pollen. The floral axis at the junction of male and female parts is bright red to maroon or brown.

=== Subspecies ===
There are many subspecies:

- Chylismia claviformis subsp. aurantiaca – found in desert regions
- Chylismia claviformis subsp. claviformis – native to the Mojave Desert and nearby
- Chylismia claviformis subsp. cruciformis – native to the Great Basin region
- Chylismia claviformis subsp. funerea – native to the Mojave Desert
- Chylismia claviformis subsp. integrior
- Chylismia claviformis subsp. lancifolia – (lanceleaf browneyes) – California east of the Sierra Nevada
- Chylismia claviformis subsp. peeblesii – (Peebles' browneyes) – found in Arizona and New Mexico
- Chylismia claviformis subsp. peirsonii – (Peirson's browneyes) – native to Southern California and northern Baja California
- Chylismia claviformis subsp. rubescens – native to Arizona
- Chylismia claviformis subsp. wigginsii
- Chylismia claviformis subsp. yumae – (Yuma browneyes) – found in the Sonoran Desert
