= List of areas in the United States National Park System =

Logo of the National Park Service

The National Park System of the United States is the collection of physical properties owned or administered by the National Park Service. The collection includes all national parks and most national monuments, as well as several other types of protected areas of the United States.

As of October 2026, there are 434 official units of the National Park System. However, this number is somewhat misleading. For example, Denali National Park and Preserve is counted as two units, since the same name applies to a national park and an adjacent national preserve. Yet Jean Lafitte National Historical Park and Preserve is counted as one unit, despite its double designation. Counting methodology is typically based on the language of a park's authorizing legislation.

Although the designations generally reflect sites' features, all units of the system are considered administratively equal and with few exceptions the designations themselves do not define their level of protection. Each site has a management plan consistent with its ecological, historic, and recreational resources and its enabling legislation.

In addition to areas of the National Park System, the National Park Service also provides technical and financial assistance to several affiliated areas authorized by Congress. Affiliated areas are marked on the lists below.

National Park System units are found in all 50 states, the District of Columbia, and the U.S. territories of Guam, American Samoa, the U.S. Virgin Islands, and Puerto Rico. The territory of the Northern Mariana Islands has an affiliated area but not an official NPS unit.

Nearly all units managed by the National Park Service participate in the National Park Passport Stamps program.

== National parks ==
There are 64 officially designated national parks in the United States and its dependent areas, as of 2026. The national parks are considered the "crown jewels" of the system and are typically larger than other areas, including a variety of significant ecological and geological resources. Additions to this designation made since the year 1999 specifically have defied this tradition, trending towards protecting sites that are smaller in area. Eight of the eleven smallest national parks were established in that timeframe.

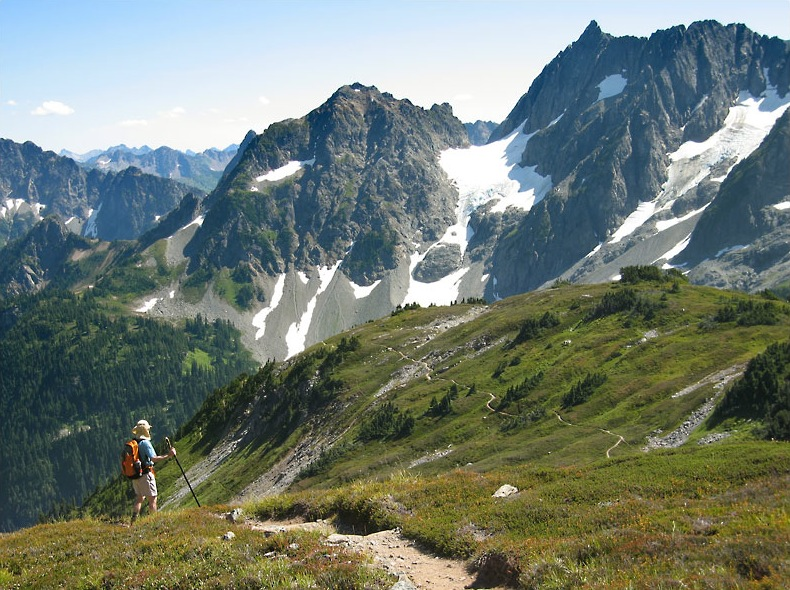
North Cascades National Park

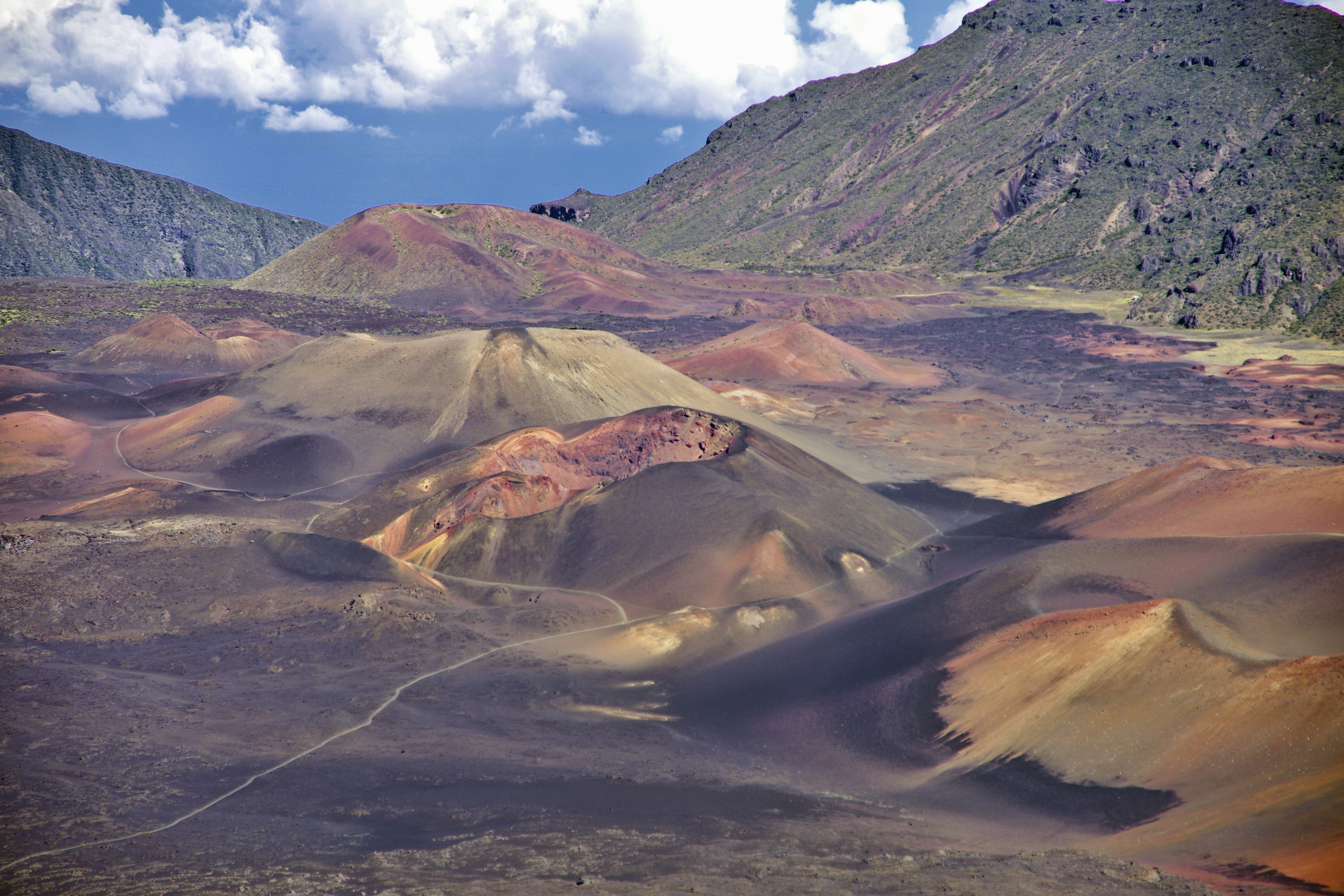
Haleakalā National Park

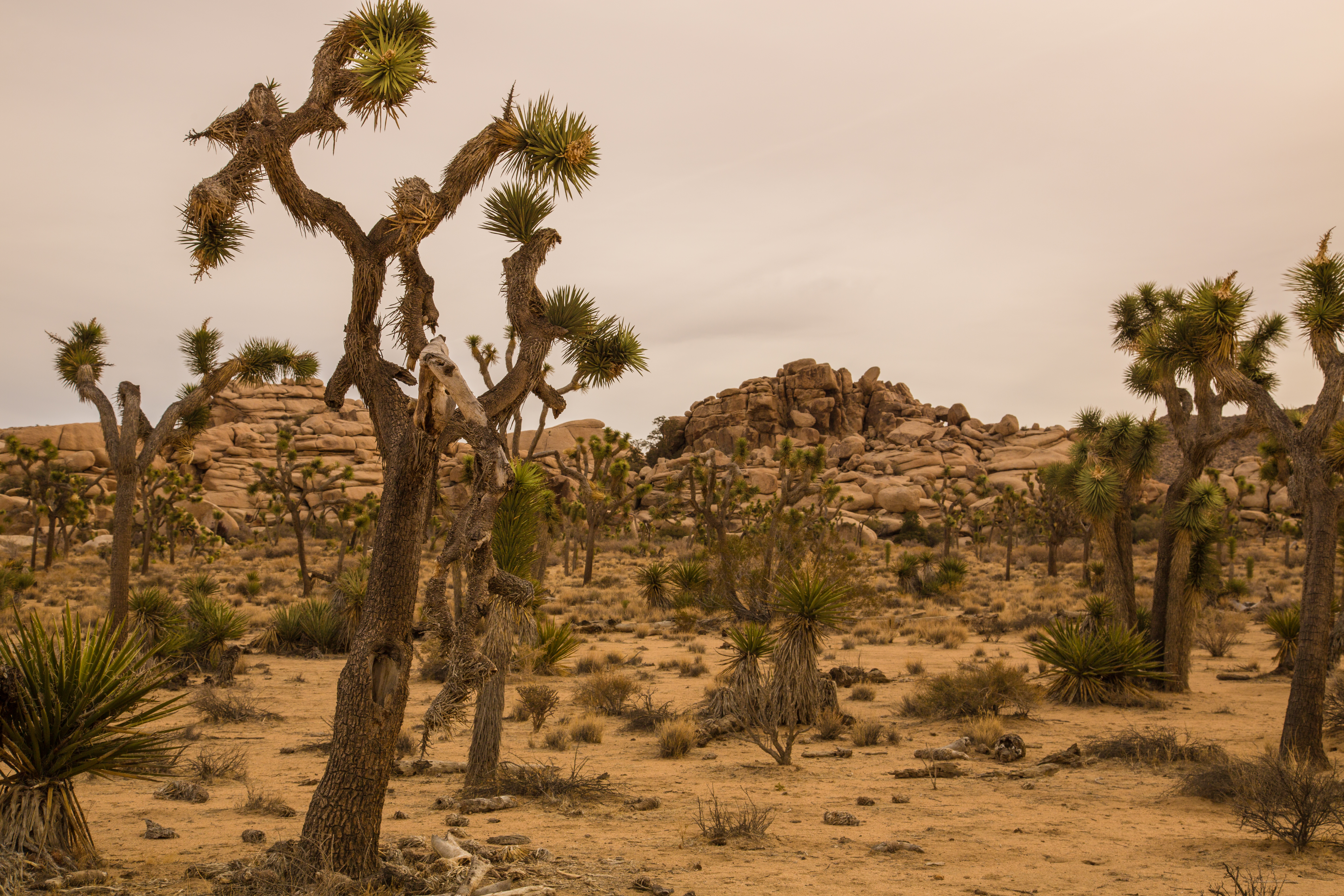
Joshua Tree National Park

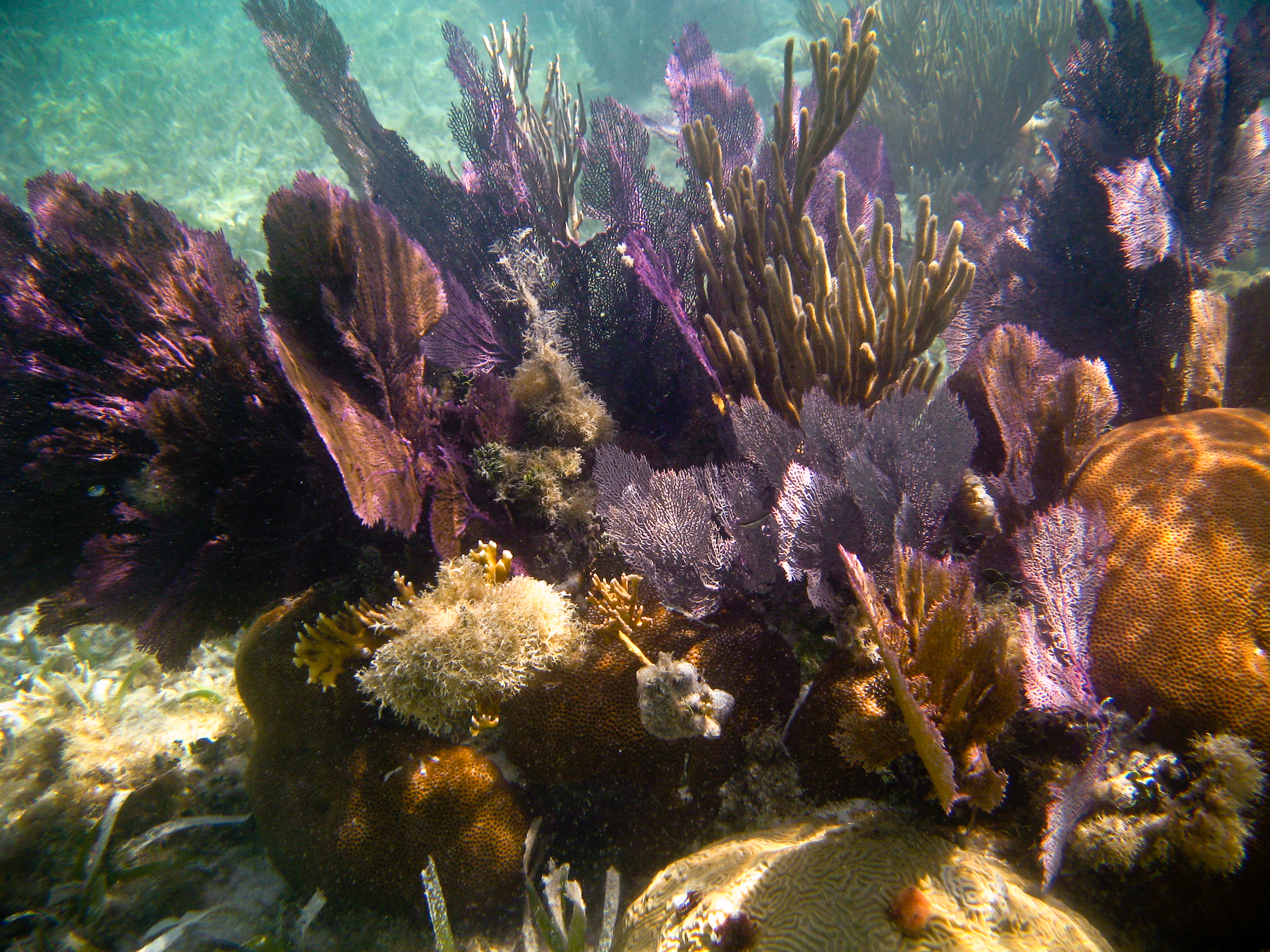
Dry Tortugas National Park

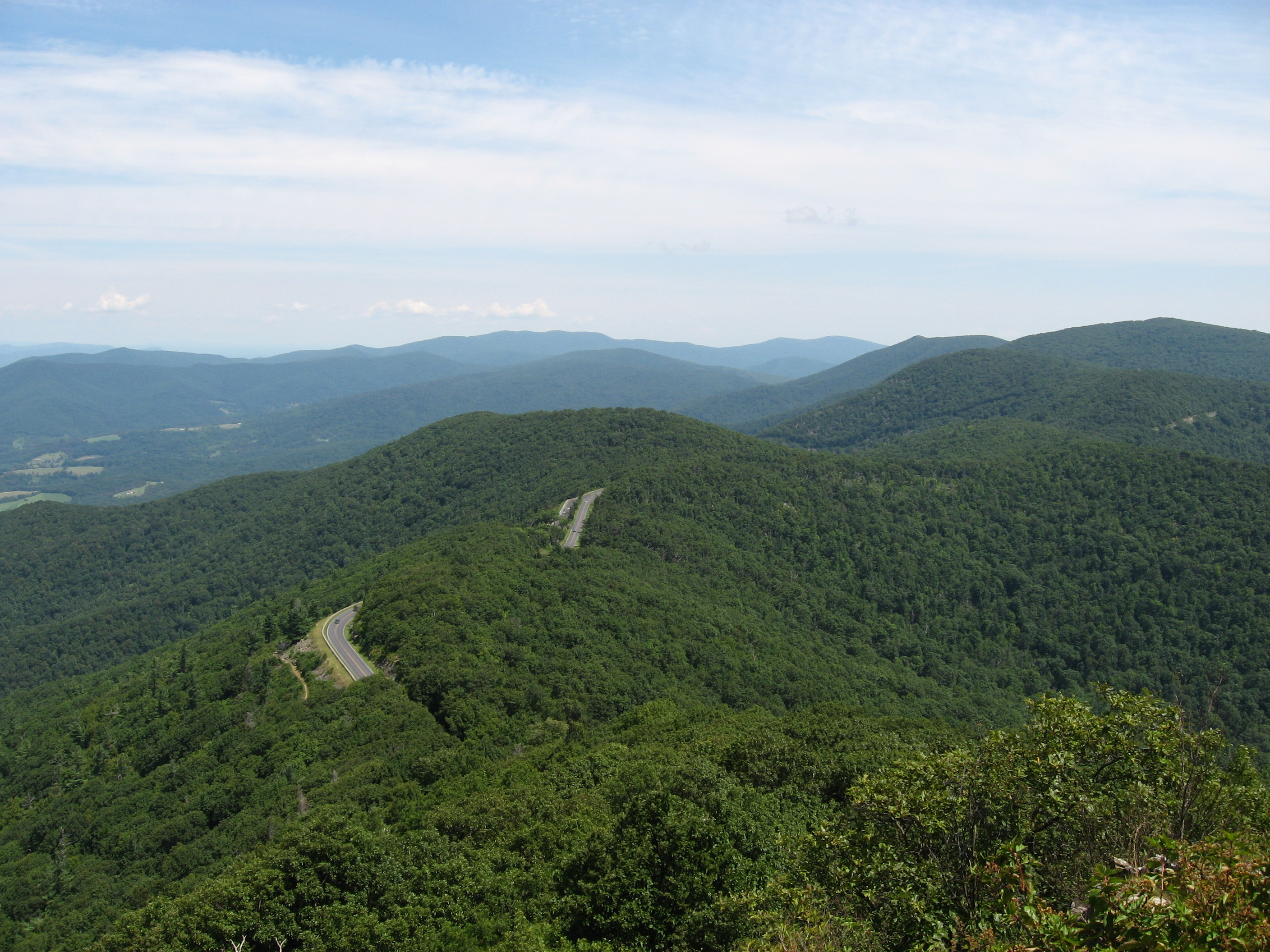
Shenandoah National Park

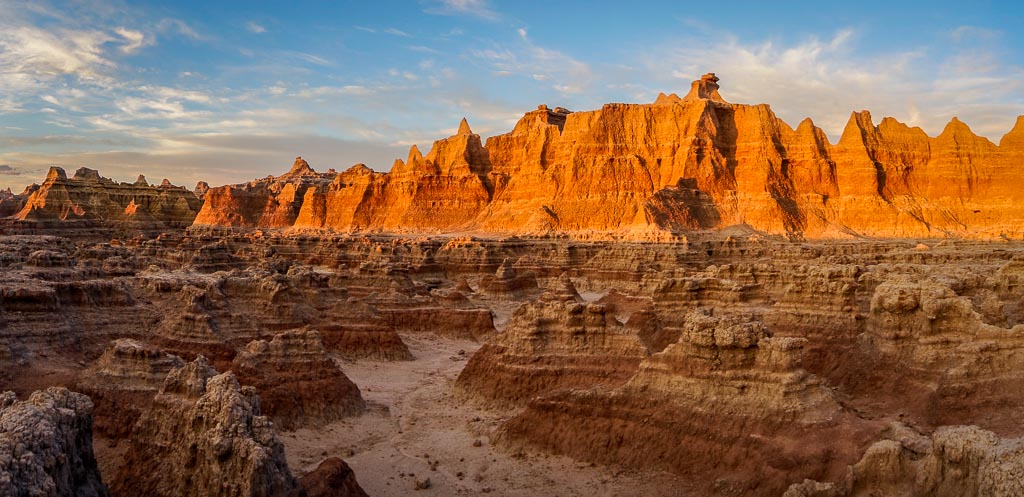
Badlands National Park

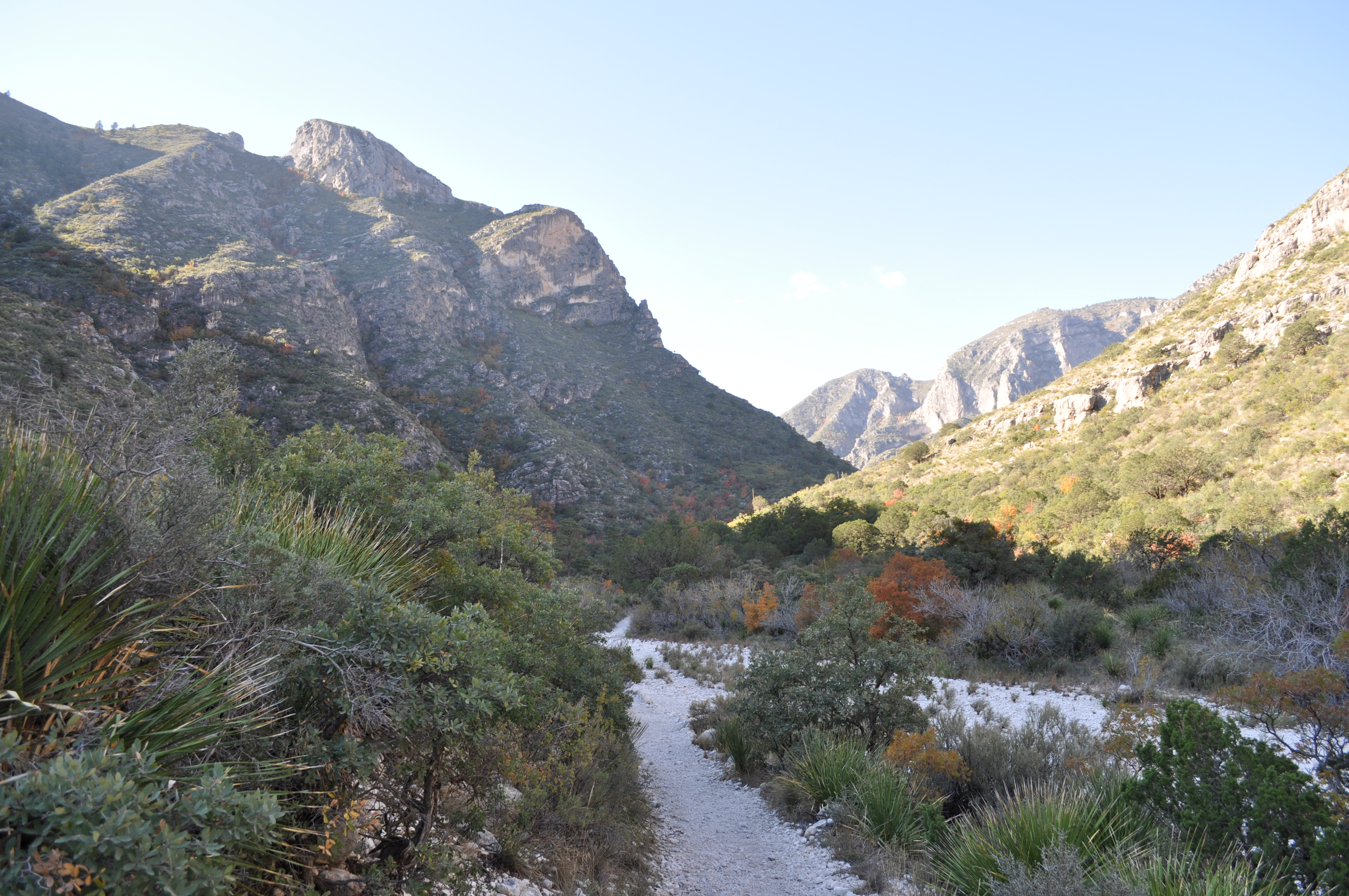
Guadalupe Mountains National Park

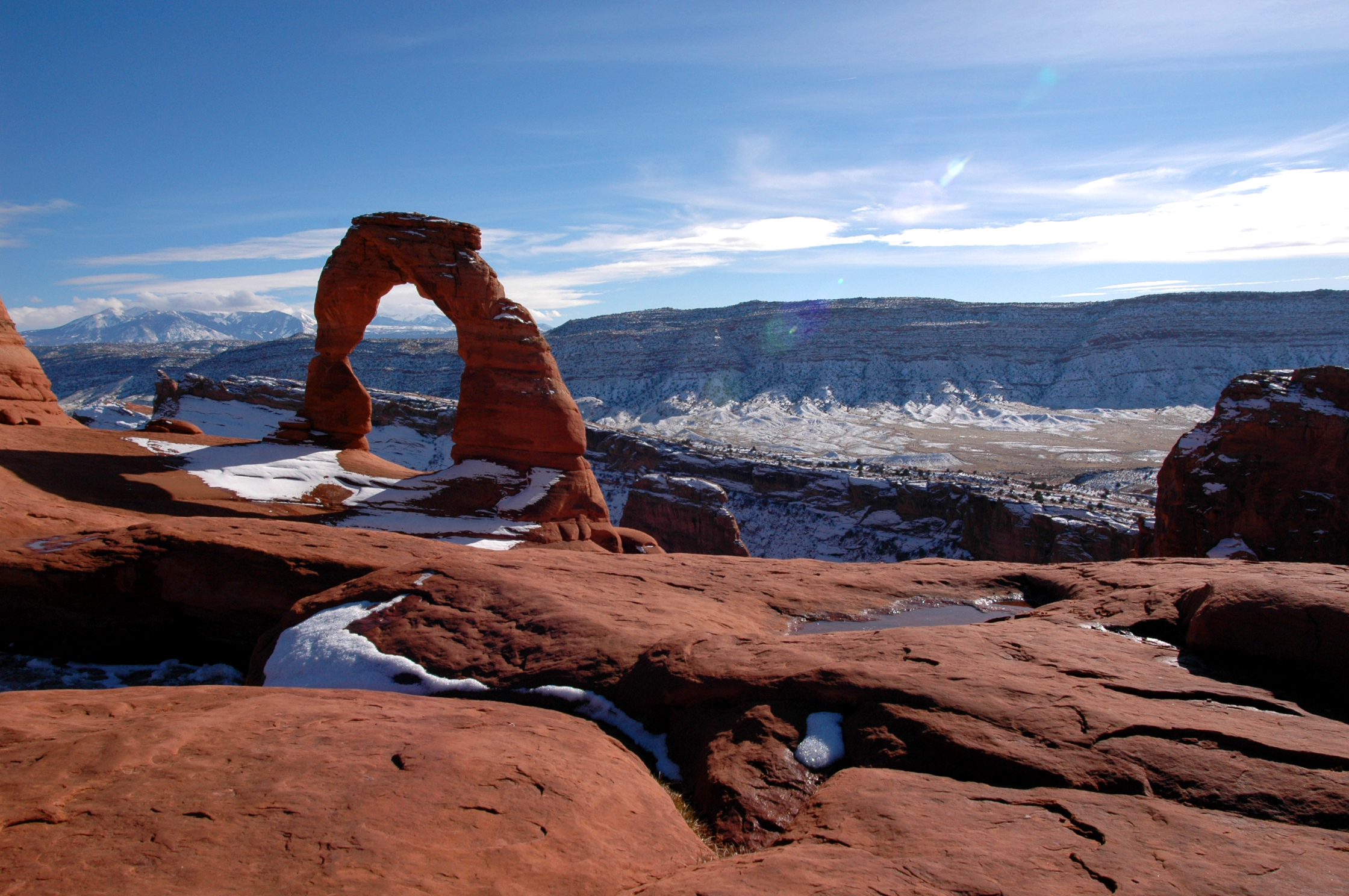
Arches National Park

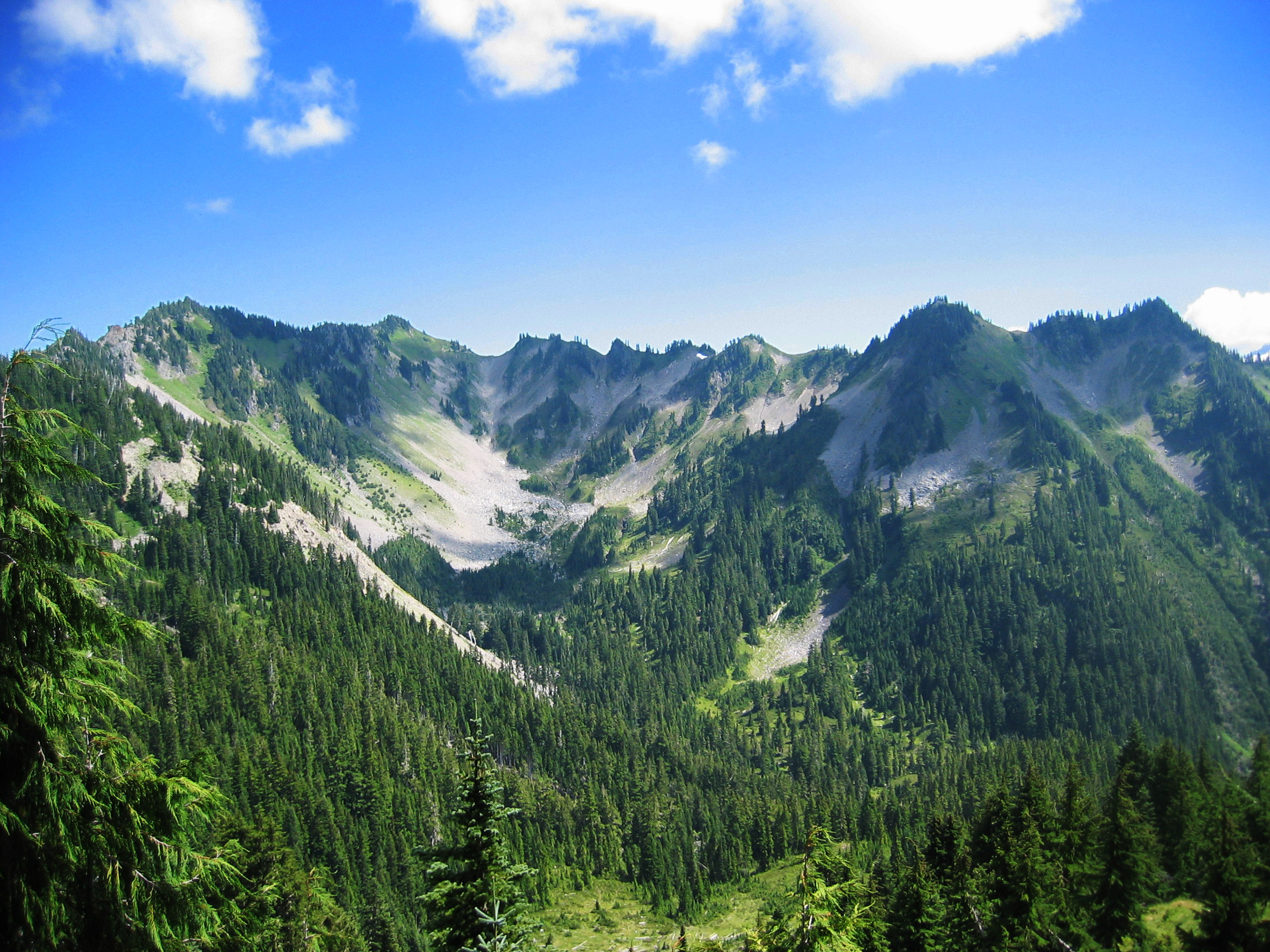
Olympic National Park

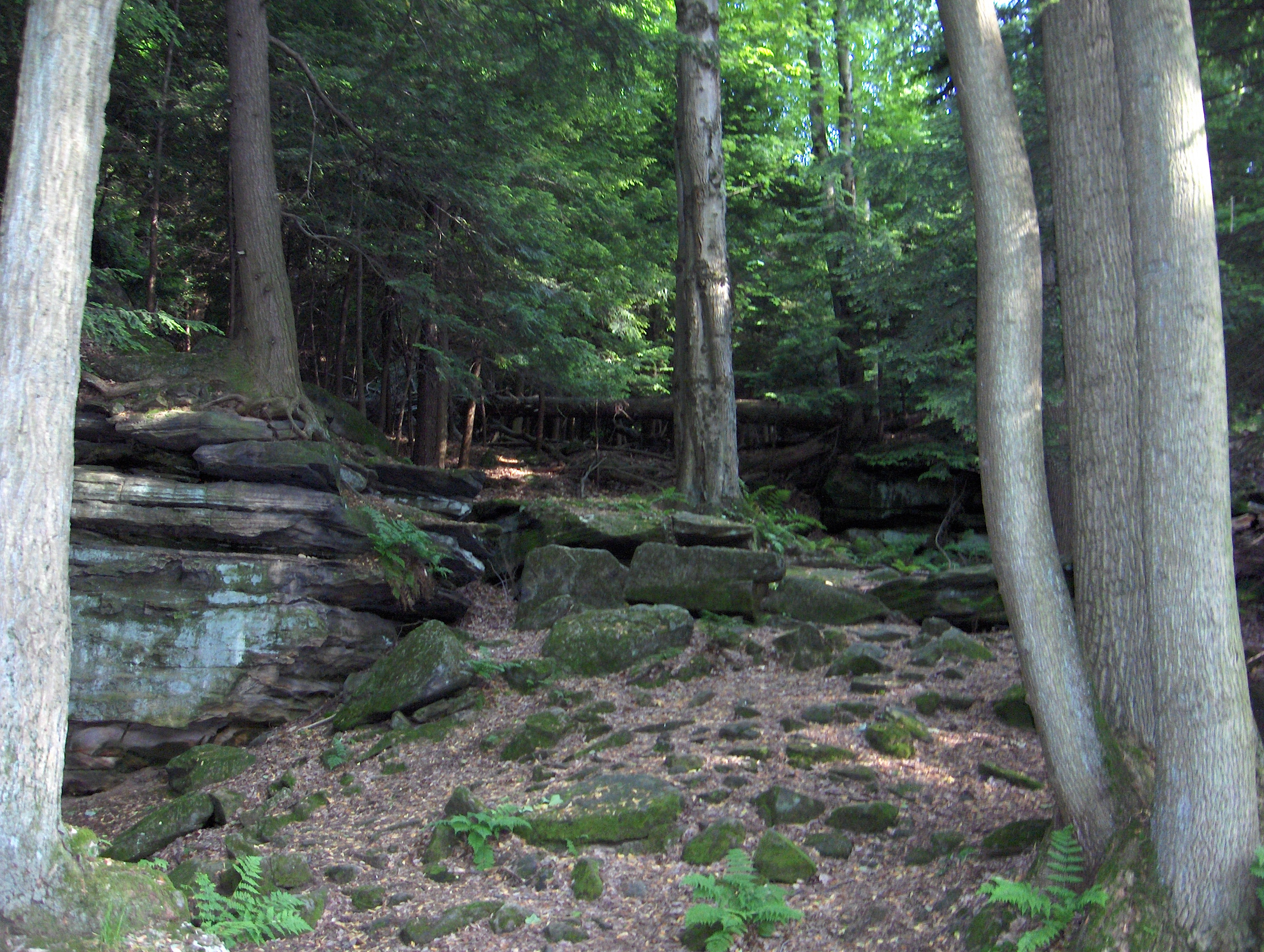
Cuyahoga Valley National Park

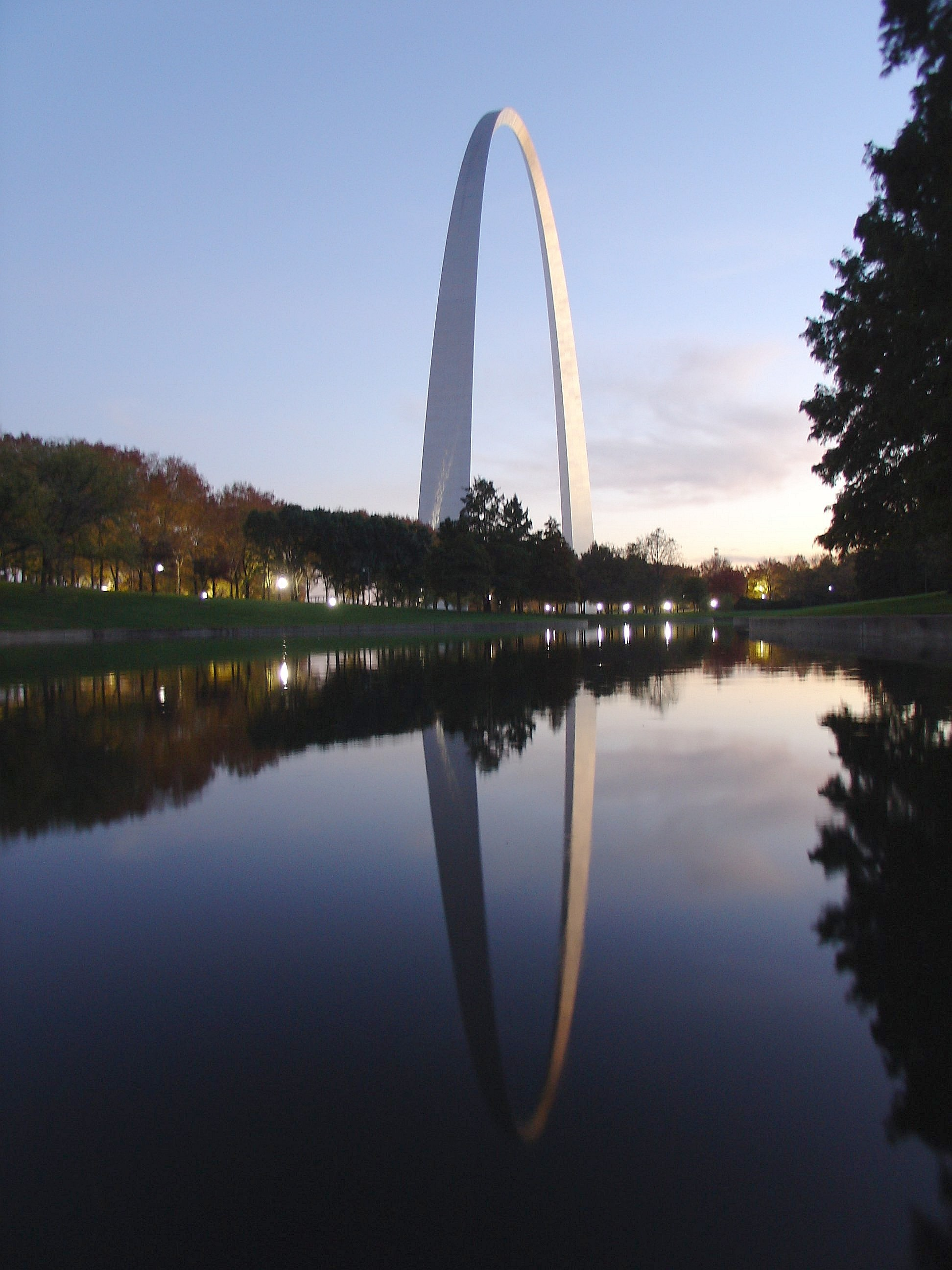
Gateway Arch National Park

Name	Location	Year established	Area (2026)	
Name	Location	Year established	Acres	km^{2}
Acadia National Park	Maine	1919	49,076.65	198.6062
National Park of American Samoa	American Samoa	1988	8,256.67	33.4136
Arches National Park	Utah	1971	76,678.98	310.3088
Badlands National Park	South Dakota	1978	242,742.90	982.3457
Big Bend National Park	Texas	1944	801,162.34	3,242.1890
Biscayne National Park	Florida	1980	172,971.11	699.9892
Black Canyon of the Gunnison National Park	Colorado	1999	30,779.83	124.5616
Bryce Canyon National Park	Utah	1928	35,835.08	145.0194
Canyonlands National Park	Utah	1964	337,597.83	1,366.2099
Capitol Reef National Park	Utah	1971	241,904.50	978.9528
Carlsbad Caverns National Park	New Mexico	1930	46,766.45	189.2571
Channel Islands National Park	California	1980	249,561.00	1,009.9375
Chiricahua National Park	Arizona	2026	12,024.73	48.6624
Congaree National Park	South Carolina	2003	26,692.60	108.0211
Crater Lake National Park	Oregon	1902	183,224.05	741.4814
Cuyahoga Valley National Park	Ohio	2000	32,607.20	131.9567
Death Valley National Park	California, Nevada	1994	3,408,374.95	13,793.2041
Denali National Park	Alaska	1917	4,740,911.16	19,185.7868
Dry Tortugas National Park	Florida	1992	64,701.22	261.8365
Everglades National Park	Florida	1947	1,508,939.07	6,106.4598
Gates of the Arctic National Park	Alaska	1980	7,523,897.45	30,448.1327
Gateway Arch National Park	Missouri	2018	192.83	0.7804
Glacier National Park (part of Waterton–Glacier International Peace Park)	Montana	1910	1,013,126.39	4,099.9770
Glacier Bay National Park	Alaska	1980	3,223,383.43	13,044.5699
Grand Canyon National Park	Arizona	1919	1,201,647.03	4,862.8930
Grand Teton National Park	Wyoming	1929	310,044.36	1,254.7050
Great Basin National Park	Nevada	1986	77,180.00	312.3364
Great Sand Dunes National Park	Colorado	2004	107,336.95	434.3772
Great Smoky Mountains National Park	North Carolina, Tennessee	1934	522,426.88	2,114.1866
Guadalupe Mountains National Park	Texas	1966	86,367.10	349.5153
Haleakalā National Park	Hawaii	1916	33,489.24	135.5261
Hawaii Volcanoes National Park	Hawaii	1916	344,812.18	1,395.4054
Hot Springs National Park	Arkansas	1921	5,554.15	22.4768
Indiana Dunes National Park	Indiana	2019	16,267.53	65.8324
Isle Royale National Park	Michigan	1940	571,790.30	2,313.9532
Joshua Tree National Park	California	1994	795,155.85	3,217.8816
Katmai National Park	Alaska	1980	3,674,529.33	14,870.2926
Kenai Fjords National Park	Alaska	1980	669,650.05	2,709.9776
Kings Canyon National Park	California	1940	461,901.37	1,869.2485
Kobuk Valley National Park	Alaska	1980	1,750,716.16	7,084.8969
Lake Clark National Park	Alaska	1980	2,619,816.49	10,602.0212
Lassen Volcanic National Park	California	1916	106,589.02	431.3505
Mammoth Cave National Park	Kentucky	1941	72,041.73	291.5425
Mesa Verde National Park	Colorado	1906	52,485.17	212.3999
Mount Rainier National Park	Washington	1899	236,381.64	956.6026
New River Gorge National Park and Preserve	West Virginia	2020	72,405.24	293.0136
North Cascades National Park	Washington	1968	504,780.94	2,042.7760
Olympic National Park	Washington	1938	923,045.80	3,735.4338
Petrified Forest National Park	Arizona	1962	221,390.21	895.9344
Pinnacles National Park	California	2013	26,685.73	107.9933
Redwood National and State Parks	California	1968	139,090.97	562.8812
Rocky Mountain National Park	Colorado	1915	265,917.74	1,076.1309
Saguaro National Park	Arizona	1994	92,799.73	375.5472
Sequoia National Park	California	1890	404,062.63	1,635.1834
Shenandoah National Park	Virginia	1935	200,454.01	811.2086
Theodore Roosevelt National Park	North Dakota	1978	70,446.04	285.0850
Virgin Islands National Park	U.S. Virgin Islands	1956	15,041.03	60.8689
Voyageurs National Park	Minnesota	1975	218,223.25	883.1182
White Sands National Park	New Mexico	2019	146,344.31	592.2344
Wind Cave National Park	South Dakota	1903	33,970.84	137.4751
Wrangell–St. Elias National Park	Alaska	1980	8,323,146.48	33,682.5788
Yellowstone National Park	Idaho, Montana, Wyoming	1872	2,219,790.71	8,983.1743
Yosemite National Park	California	1890	761,747.50	3,082.6828
Zion National Park	Utah	1919	147,242.66	595.8699

=== Former national parks ===
There is no formal list defining what does and doesn't constitute a former national park. There are four sites that were unquestionably national parks which have clearly lost that status (Abraham Lincoln, Fort McHenry, Mackinac, and Platt). Some sources cite only these four, while articles naming as many as six additional examples can be found.

This table contains the most commonly discussed sites, as well as an overview of why their status is debated.

Name	Established	Disestablished	Result/Notes
Abraham Lincoln National Park	July 17, 1916	August 11, 1939	Redesignated as Abraham Lincoln Birthplace National Historical Park
Fort McHenry National Park	March 3, 1925	August 11, 1939	Redesignated under the unique designation of Fort McHenry National Monument and Historic Shrine
General Grant National Park	October 1, 1890	March 4, 1940	Incorporated into Kings Canyon National Park. Some sources consider General Grant and Kings Canyon to be separate iterations, while others regard it as a simultaneous expansion and renaming, maintaining continuity as a single park.
Hawaii National Park	August 1, 1916	September 13, 1960	Divided into Hawaii Volcanoes National Park and Haleakala National Park. As all its land was retained, some sources consider Hawaii National Park to have simply been renamed Hawaii Volcanoes, with only Haleakala being a new park.
Mackinac National Park	April 15, 1875	March 2, 1895	Transferred to Michigan; now operated as Mackinac Island State Park
Platt National Park	June 29, 1906	March 17, 1976	Incorporated with Arbuckle Recreation Area and redesignated Chickasaw National Recreation Area
Rock Creek Park	September 27, 1890	August 10, 1933	Never officially held the designation of a national park but was established before the concept was formalized. The site was always federally administered alongside the other national parks until it was incorporated into National Capital Parks.
Sullys Hill Park	April 27, 1904	March 3, 1931	Not officially designated as a national park but was established before the guidelines were formalized. Transferred to the U.S. Fish and Wildlife Service; now operated as White Horse Hill National Game Preserve

== National monuments ==
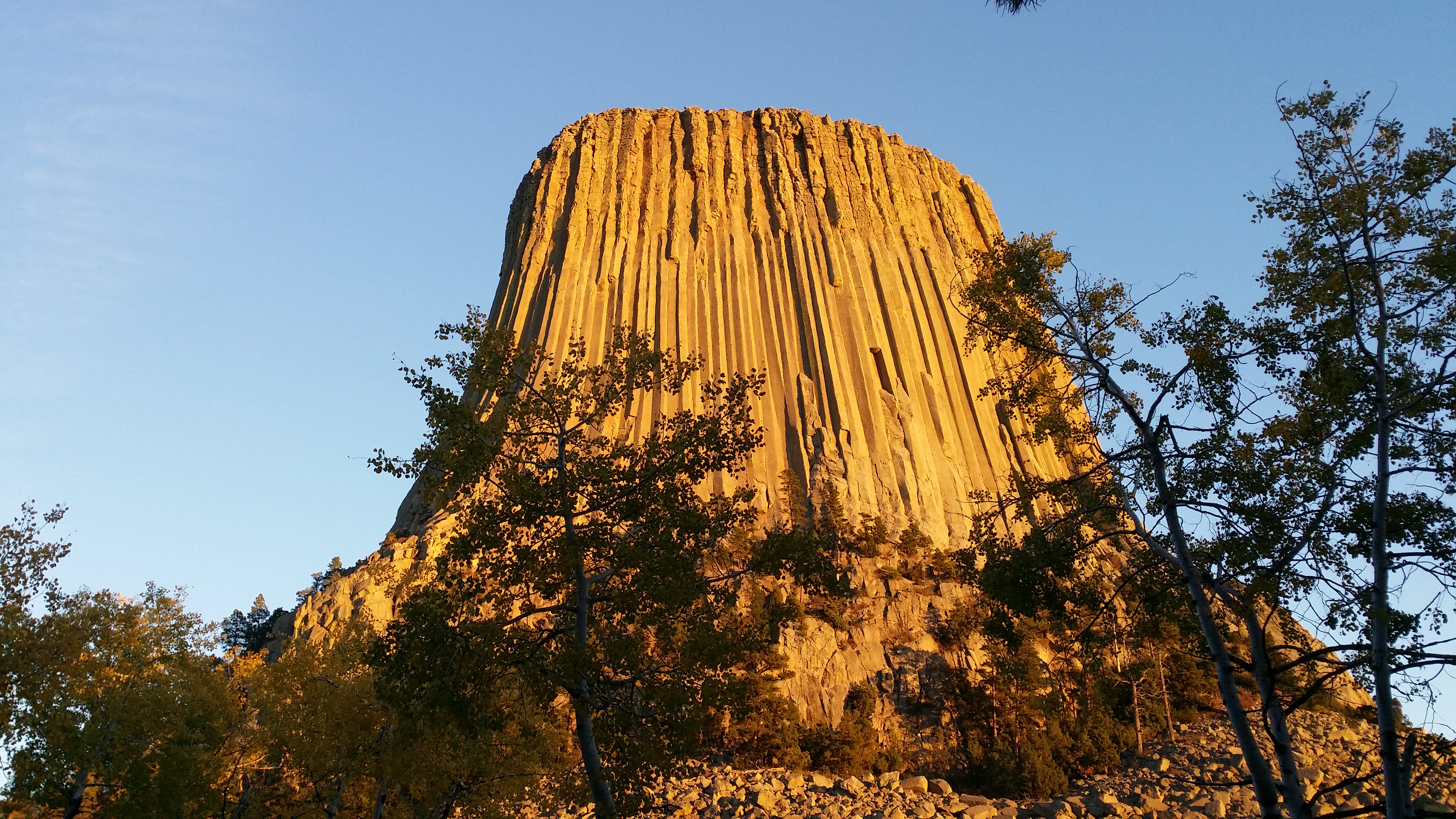
Devils Tower National Monument

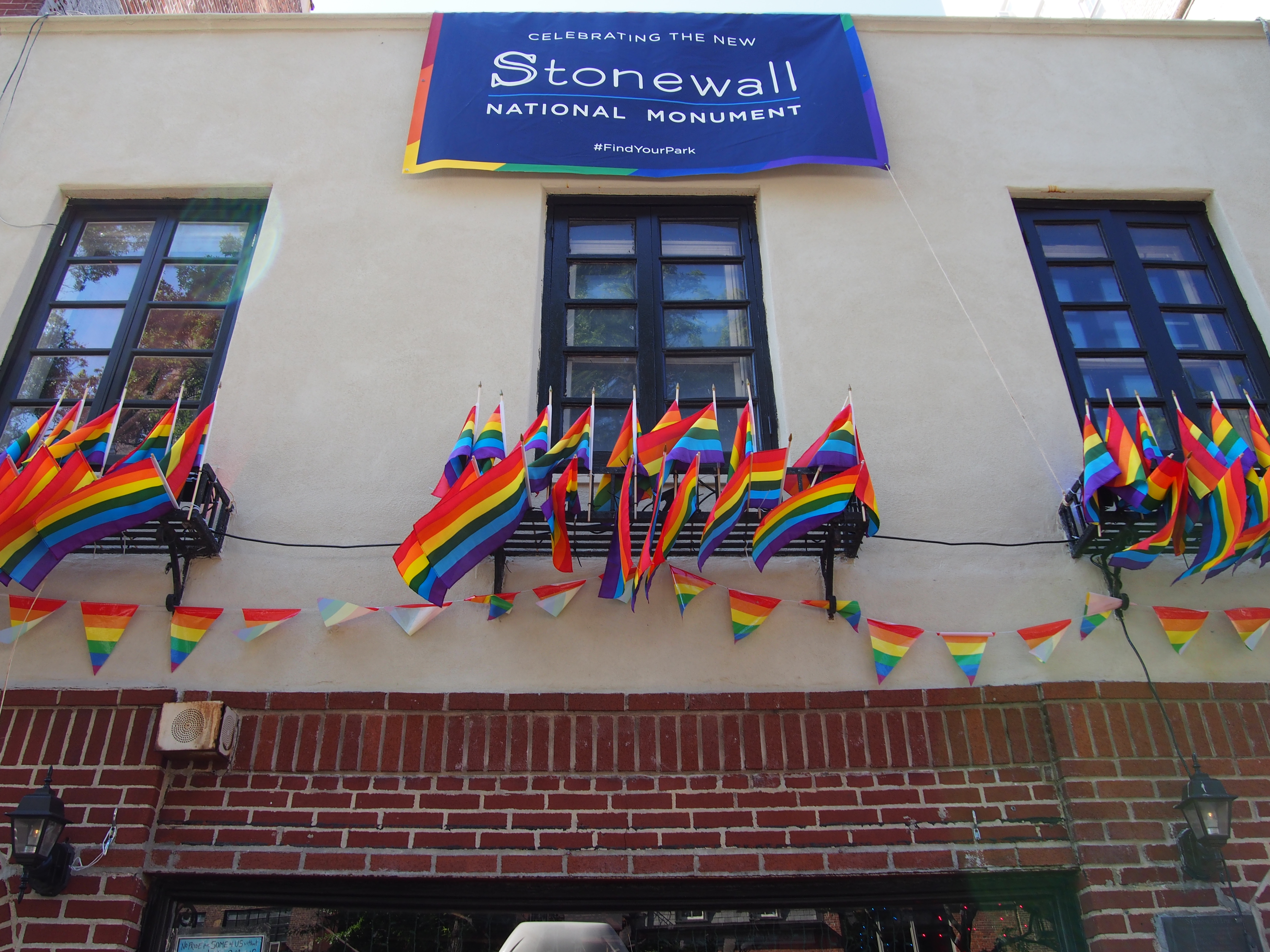
Stonewall National Monument

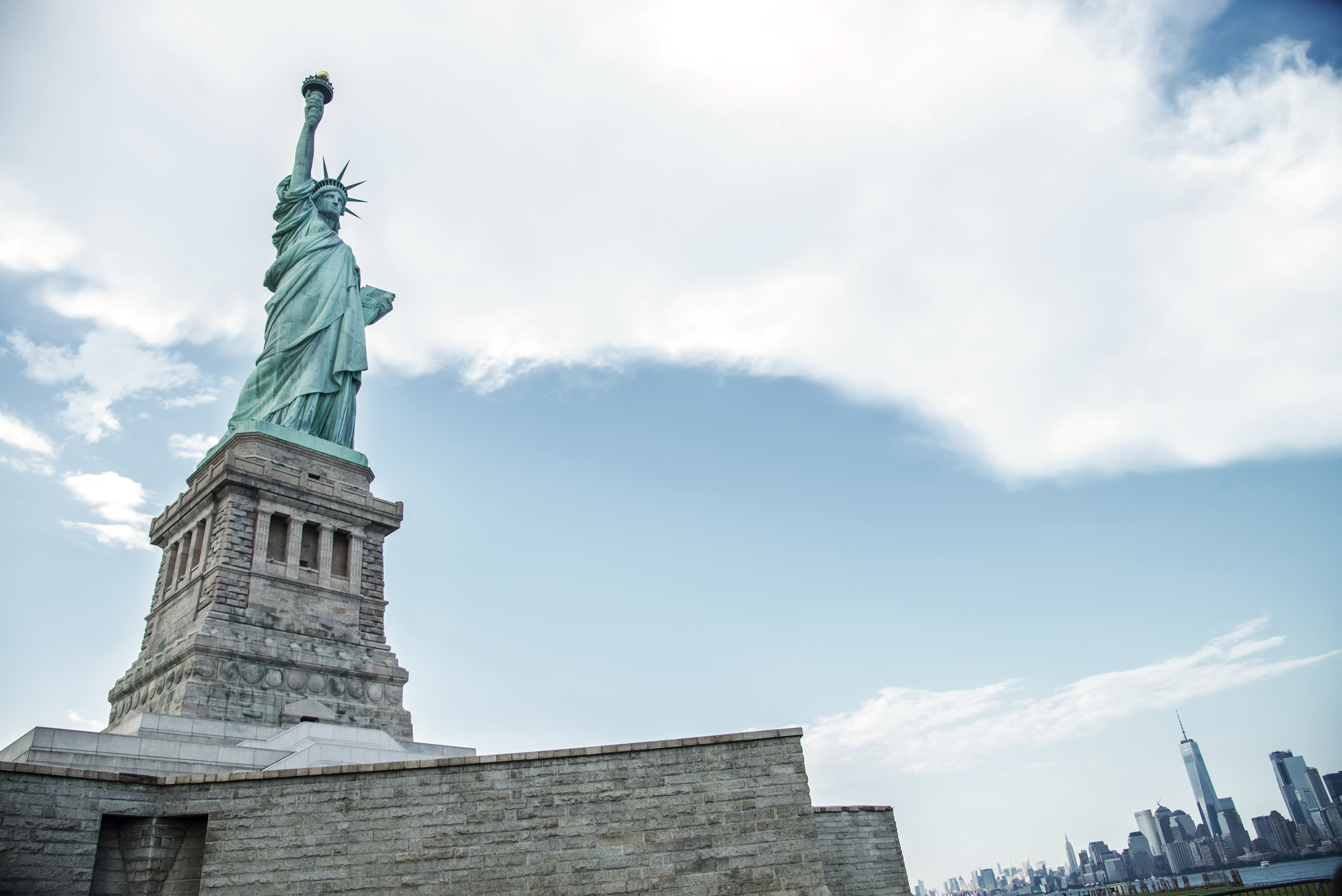
Statue of Liberty National Monument

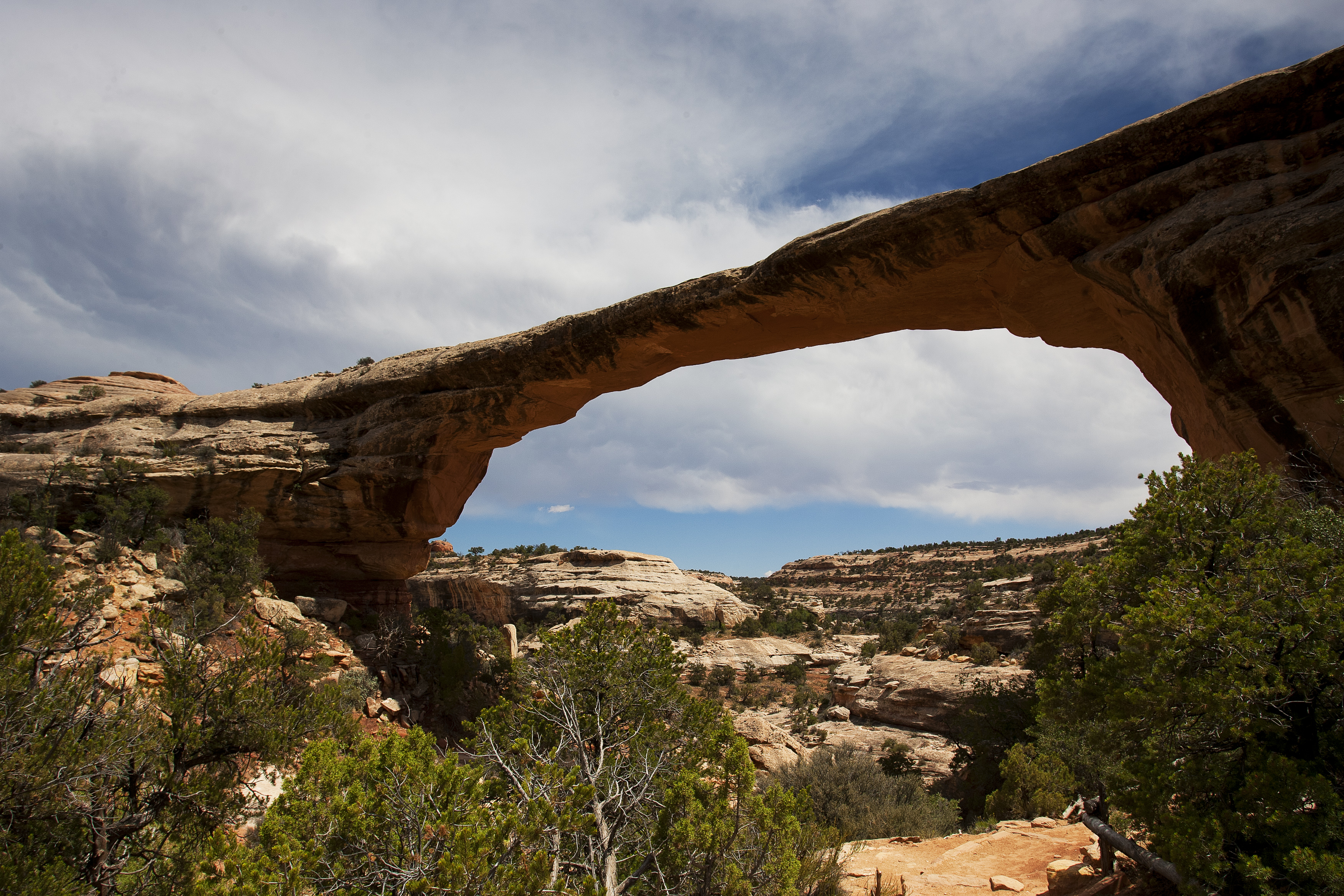
Natural Bridges National Monument

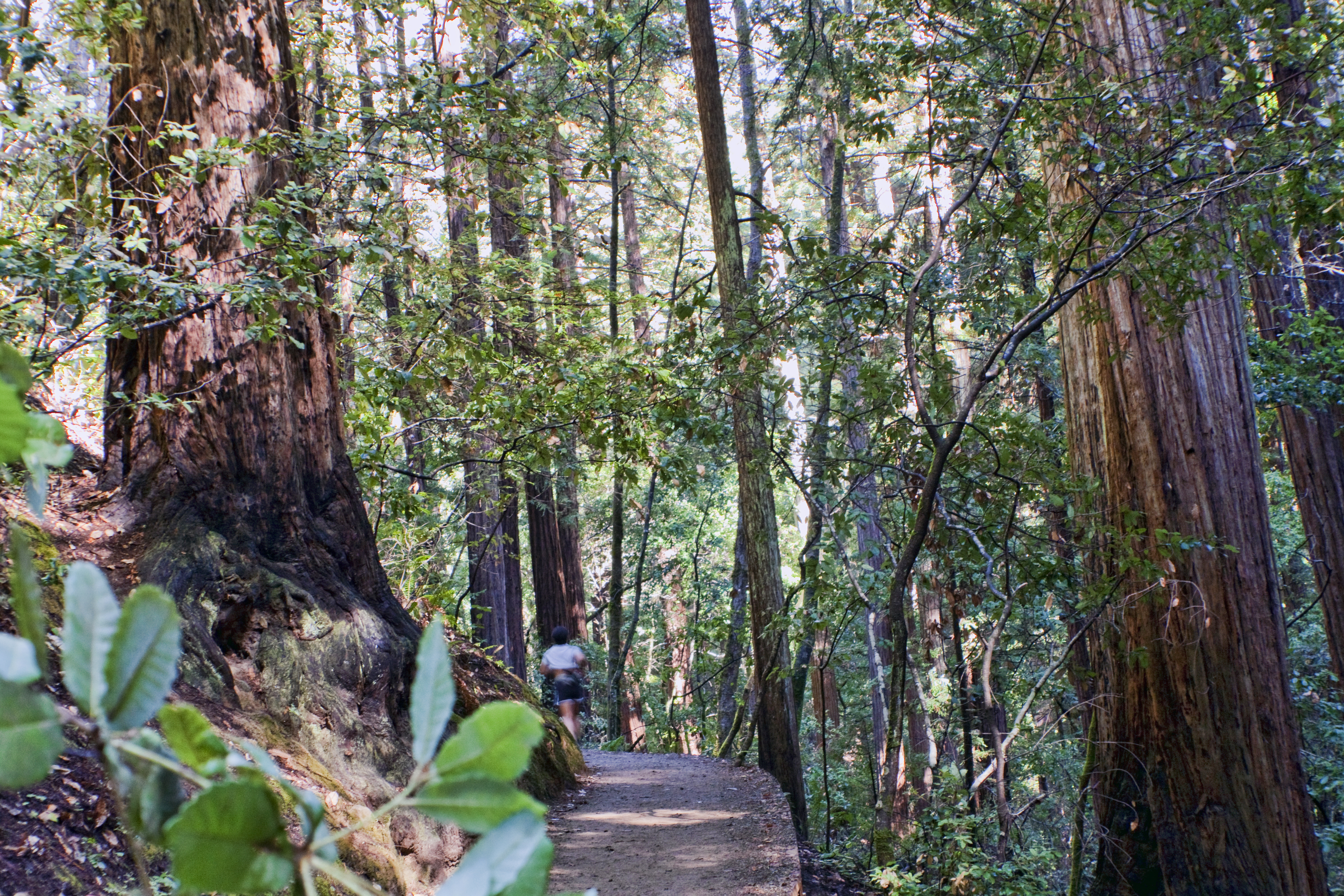
Muir Woods National Monument

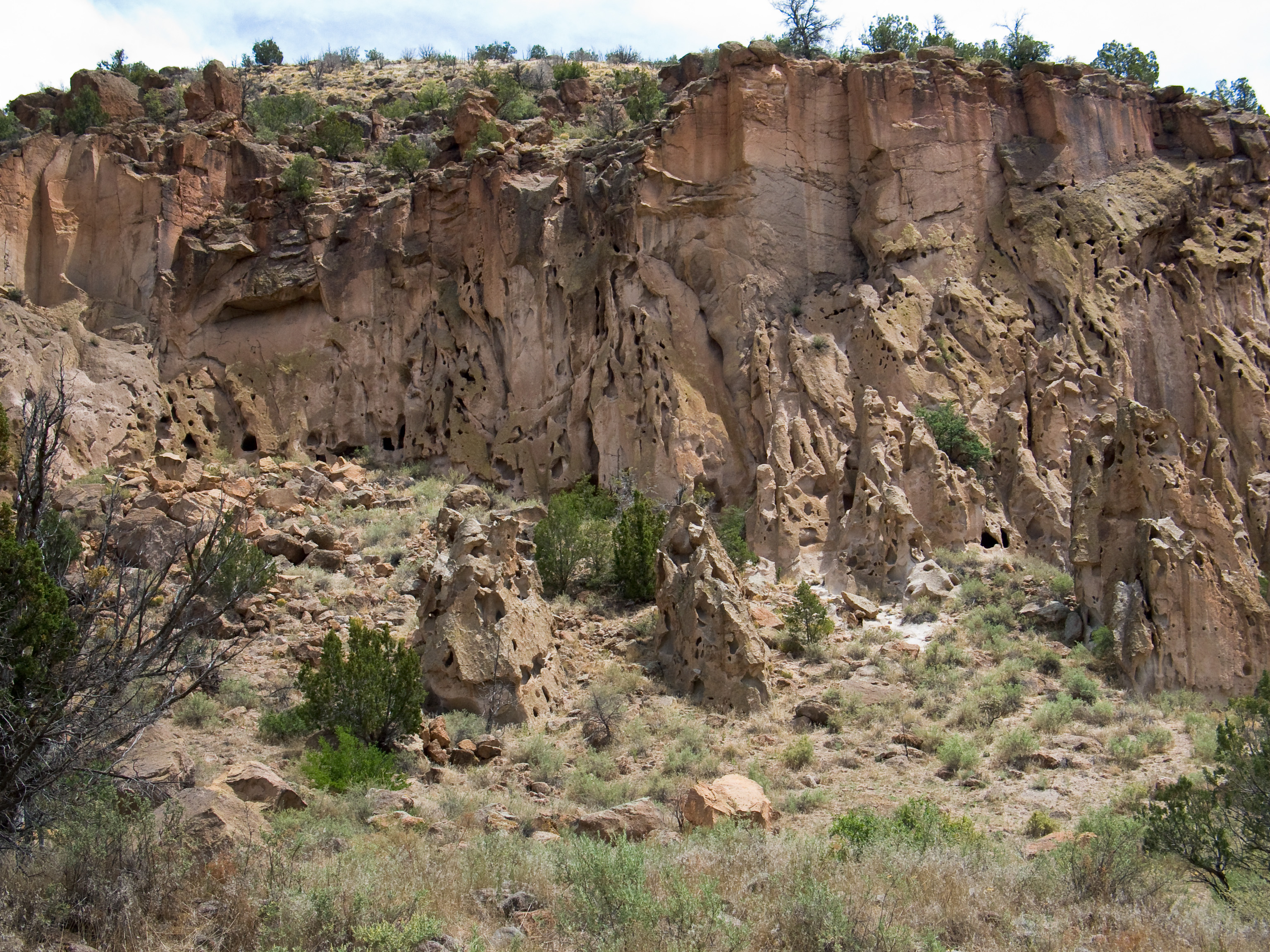
Bandelier National Monument

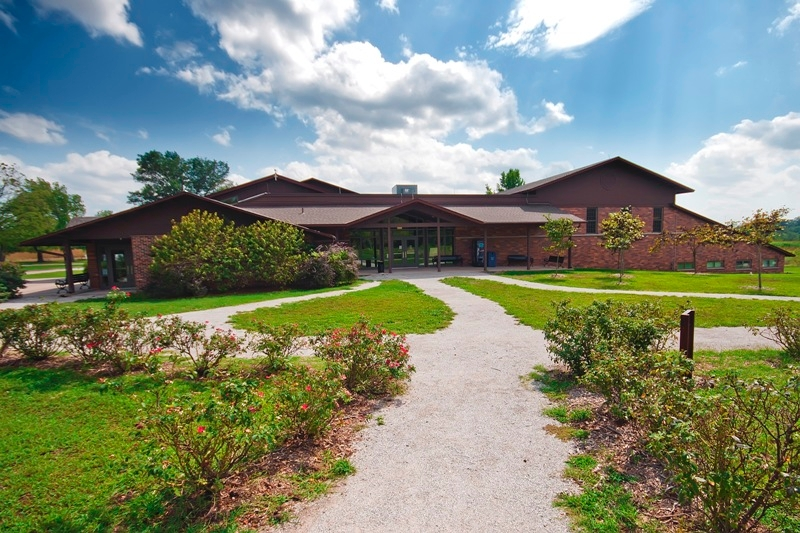
George Washington Carver National Monument

There are 137 national monuments, 88 of which are administered by the NPS and are listed below. Of these, 86 (all except Grand Canyon-Parashant and Avi Kwa Ame) are NPS official units. The remaining 49 monuments are administered by five other federal agencies. Three, Grand Canyon–Parashant, Craters of the Moon, and Avi Kwa Ame National Monuments, are jointly administered by the NPS and the Bureau of Land Management, and Tule Lake National Monument is joint with the Fish and Wildlife Service. National monuments are typically smaller and protect just one or few major resources. They include both natural and historical sites and can be established by the president under the Antiquities Act. 35 former national monuments have been redesignated or incorporated into national parks.

Name	Location	Area
African Burial Ground National Monument	New York	0.35 acres (0.0014 km^{2})
Agate Fossil Beds National Monument	Nebraska	3,057.87 acres (12.3748 km^{2})
Alibates Flint Quarries National Monument	Texas	1,370.97 acres (5.5481 km^{2})
Aniakchak National Monument and Preserve	Alaska	137,176.00 acres (555.1316 km^{2})
Avi Kwa Ame National Monument (not an official NPS unit)	Nevada	NPS manages 63,901 acres (258.60 km^{2}) of 506,733 acres (2,050.68 km^{2})
Aztec Ruins National Monument	New Mexico	318.40 acres (1.2885 km^{2})
Bandelier National Monument	New Mexico	33,676.67 acres (136.2846 km^{2})
Belmont–Paul Women's Equality National Monument	District of Columbia	0.34 acres (0.0014 km^{2})
Birmingham Civil Rights National Monument	Alabama	18.25 acres (0.0739 km^{2})
Booker T. Washington National Monument	Virginia	239.01 acres (0.9672 km^{2})
Buck Island Reef National Monument	U.S. Virgin Islands	19,015.47 acres (76.9529 km^{2})
Cabrillo National Monument	California	159.94 acres (0.6473 km^{2})
Camp Nelson National Monument	Kentucky	464.97 acres (1.8817 km^{2})
Canyon de Chelly National Monument	Arizona	83,840.00 acres (339.2884 km^{2})
Cape Krusenstern National Monument	Alaska	649,096.15 acres (2,626.7989 km^{2})
Capulin Volcano National Monument	New Mexico	792.84 acres (3.2085 km^{2})
Carlisle Federal Indian Boarding School National Monument	Pennsylvania	24.50 acres (0.0991 km^{2})
Casa Grande Ruins National Monument	Arizona	472.50 acres (1.9121 km^{2})
Castillo de San Marcos National Monument	Florida	19.38 acres (0.0784 km^{2})
Castle Clinton National Monument	New York	1.00 acre (0.0040 km^{2})
Castle Mountains National Monument	California	21,025.50 acres (85.0872 km^{2})
Cedar Breaks National Monument	Utah	6,154.60 acres (24.9068 km^{2})
César E. Chávez National Monument	California	116.56 acres (0.4717 km^{2})
Charles Young Buffalo Soldiers National Monument	Ohio	59.66 acres (0.2414 km^{2})
Colorado National Monument	Colorado	20,536.39 acres (83.1078 km^{2})
Craters of the Moon National Monument and Preserve	Idaho	53,437.64 acres (216.2545 km^{2})
Devils Postpile National Monument	California	800.19 acres (3.2383 km^{2})
Devils Tower National Monument	Wyoming	1,347.21 acres (5.4520 km^{2})
Dinosaur National Monument	Utah, Colorado	210,281.92 acres (850.9807 km^{2})
Effigy Mounds National Monument	Iowa	2,526.39 acres (10.2239 km^{2})
El Malpais National Monument	New Mexico	114,247.25 acres (462.3422 km^{2})
El Morro National Monument	New Mexico	1,278.72 acres (5.1748 km^{2})
Emmett Till and Mamie Till-Mobley National Monument	Illinois, Mississippi	5.70 acres (0.0231 km^{2})
Florissant Fossil Beds National Monument	Colorado	6,278.09 acres (25.4065 km^{2})
Fort Frederica National Monument	Georgia	305.34 acres (1.2357 km^{2})
Fort Matanzas National Monument	Florida	300.11 acres (1.2145 km^{2})
Fort McHenry National Monument and Historic Shrine	Maryland	43.26 acres (0.1751 km^{2})
Fort Monroe National Monument	Virginia	367.12 acres (1.4857 km^{2})
Fort Pulaski National Monument	Georgia	5,623.10 acres (22.7559 km^{2})
Fort Stanwix National Monument	New York	15.52 acres (0.0628 km^{2})
Fort Union National Monument	New Mexico	720.60 acres (2.9162 km^{2})
Fossil Butte National Monument	Wyoming	8,198.00 acres (33.1761 km^{2})
Frances Perkins National Monument	Maine	57.00 acres (0.2307 km^{2})
Freedom Riders National Monument	Alabama	7.83 acres (0.0317 km^{2})
George Washington Birthplace National Monument	Virginia	654.19 acres (2.6474 km^{2})
George Washington Carver National Monument	Missouri	240.00 acres (0.9712 km^{2})
Gila Cliff Dwellings National Monument	New Mexico	533.13 acres (2.1575 km^{2})
Governors Island National Monument	New York	22.91 acres (0.0927 km^{2})
Grand Canyon–Parashant National Monument (not an official NPS unit)	Arizona	NPS manages 208,439 acres (843.52 km^{2}) of 1,021,030 acres (4,132.0 km^{2})
Grand Portage National Monument	Minnesota	709.97 acres (2.8731 km^{2})
Hagerman Fossil Beds National Monument	Idaho	4,351.15 acres (17.6085 km^{2})
Hohokam Pima National Monument	Arizona	1,690.00 acres (6.8392 km^{2})
Hovenweep National Monument	Colorado, Utah	784.93 acres (3.1765 km^{2})
Jewel Cave National Monument	South Dakota	1,273.51 acres (5.1537 km^{2})
John Day Fossil Beds National Monument	Oregon	14,062.19 acres (56.9077 km^{2})
Katahdin Woods and Waters National Monument	Maine	87,564.27 acres (354.3600 km^{2})
Lava Beds National Monument	California	46,692.42 acres (188.9575 km^{2})
Little Bighorn Battlefield National Monument	Montana	765.34 acres (3.0972 km^{2})
Medgar and Myrlie Evers Home National Monument	Mississippi	0.74 acres (0.0030 km^{2})
Mill Springs Battlefield National Monument	Kentucky	1,455.94 acres (5.8920 km^{2})
Montezuma Castle National Monument	Arizona	1,015.52 acres (4.1097 km^{2})
Muir Woods National Monument	California	553.55 acres (2.2401 km^{2})
Natural Bridges National Monument	Utah	7,636.49 acres (30.9038 km^{2})
Navajo National Monument	Arizona	360.00 acres (1.4569 km^{2})
Oregon Caves National Monument and Preserve	Oregon	4,554.03 acres (18.4295 km^{2})
Organ Pipe Cactus National Monument	Arizona	330,691.83 acres (1,338.2624 km^{2})
Petroglyph National Monument	New Mexico	7,204.43 acres (29.1553 km^{2})
Pipe Spring National Monument	Arizona	40.00 acres (0.1619 km^{2})
Pipestone National Monument	Minnesota	297.08 acres (1.2022 km^{2})
Poverty Point National Monument	Louisiana	910.85 acres (3.6861 km^{2})
Rainbow Bridge National Monument	Utah	160.00 acres (0.6475 km^{2})
Russell Cave National Monument	Alabama	310.45 acres (1.2563 km^{2})
Salinas Pueblo Missions National Monument	New Mexico	1,071.42 acres (4.3359 km^{2})
Scotts Bluff National Monument	Nebraska	3,004.73 acres (12.1597 km^{2})
Springfield 1908 Race Riot National Monument	Illinois	3.23 acres (0.0131 km^{2})
Statue of Liberty National Monument	New York, New Jersey	58.38 acres (0.2363 km^{2})
Stonewall National Monument	New York	7.70 acres (0.0312 km^{2})
Sunset Crater Volcano National Monument	Arizona	3,137.71 acres (12.6979 km^{2})
Timpanogos Cave National Monument	Utah	250.00 acres (1.0117 km^{2})
Tonto National Monument	Arizona	1,120.00 acres (4.5325 km^{2})
Tule Lake National Monument	California	37.39 acres (0.1513 km^{2})
Tule Springs Fossil Beds National Monument	Nevada	22,650.00 acres (91.6613 km^{2})
Tuzigoot National Monument	Arizona	811.89 acres (3.2856 km^{2})
Virgin Islands Coral Reef National Monument	U.S. Virgin Islands	12,708.07 acres (51.4277 km^{2})
Waco Mammoth National Monument	Texas	107.23 acres (0.4339 km^{2})
Walnut Canyon National Monument	Arizona	3,200.61 acres (12.9524 km^{2})
Wupatki National Monument	Arizona	35,401.83 acres (143.2661 km^{2})
Yucca House National Monument	Colorado	195.07 acres (0.7894 km^{2})

=== Former national monuments ===
Name	Established	Disbanded	Result
Carlsbad Cave National Monument	October 5, 1923	May 14, 1930	Redesignated as Carlsbad Caverns National Park
Chiricahua National Monument	April 18, 1924	October 20, 2026	Redesignated as Chiricahua National Park
Denali National Monument	December 1, 1978	December 2, 1980	Incorporated with Mount McKinley National Park and renamed Denali National Park and Preserve
Grand Canyon National Monument	January 11, 1908	February 26, 1919	Redesignated as Grand Canyon National Park
Grand Canyon National Monument	December 22, 1932	January 3, 1975	Abolished; lands transferred with Marble Canyon National Monument into an expansion of Grand Canyon National Park.
Marble Canyon National Monument	January 20, 1969	January 3, 1975	Abolished; lands transferred with Grand Canyon National Monument into an expansion of Grand Canyon National Park.
Kobuk Valley National Monument	December 1, 1978	December 2, 1980	Redesignated as Kobuk Valley National Park
Papago Saguaro National Monument	January 31, 1914	April 7, 1930	Transferred to Arizona; now jointly operated by the cities of Phoenix and Tempe
Pullman National Monument	February 19, 2015	December 29, 2022	Redesignated as Pullman National Historical Park
Lewis and Clark Cavern National Monument	May 11, 1908	August 24, 1937	Transferred to Montana; now operated as a state park
Kenai Fjords National Monument	December 1, 1978	December 2, 1980	Redesignated as Kenai Fjords National Park
Channel Islands National Monument	April 26, 1938	March 5, 1980	Redesignated as Channel Islands National Park
Father Millet Cross National Monument	August 10, 1933	September 7, 1949	Transferred to New York upon the closing of the adjacent military base; now operated part of Fort Niagara State Park
First State National Monument	March 25, 2013	December 19, 2014	Incorporated into First State National Historical Park
Lake Clark National Monument	December 1, 1978	December 2, 1980	Renamed Lake Clark National Park and Preserve
Black Canyon of the Gunnison National Monument	March 2, 1933	October 21, 1999	Redesignated as Black Canyon of the Gunnison National Park
Harriet Tubman Underground Railroad National Monument	March 25, 2013	December 19, 2014	The National Park Service areas of this monument were incorporated into Harriet Tubman Underground Railroad National Historical Park, and the National Park Service no longer recognizes their portions of the national monument as distinct from the national historical park. The remaining portions of Harriet Tubman Underground Railroad National Monument continue to be operated by the U.S. Fish and Wildlife Service.
Mukuntuweap National Monument (renamed Zion National Monument in 1918)	July 31, 1909	November 19, 1919	Redesignated as Zion National Park
Zion National Monument ("the Kolob Canyons area")	January 22, 1937	July 11, 1956	Incorporated into Zion National Park
Capitol Reef National Monument	August 2, 1937	December 18, 1971	Redesignated as Capitol Reef National Park
Arches National Monument	April 12, 1929	November 12, 1971	Redesignated as Arches National Park
Bryce Canyon National Monument	June 8, 1923	February 25, 1928	Redesignated as Bryce Canyon National Park
Wheeler National Monument	December 7, 1908	August 3, 1950	Returned to United States Forest Service
Holy Cross National Monument	May 11, 1929	August 3, 1950	Returned to United States Forest Service
White Sands National Monument	January 18, 1933	December 20, 2019	Redesignated as White Sands National Park
Jackson Hole National Monument	1943	September 14, 1950	Merged into Grand Teton National Park
Shoshone Cavern National Monument	September 21, 1909	May 17, 1954	Transferred to Cody, Wyoming as a municipal attraction, and later returned to the Bureau of Land Management
Old Kasaan National Monument	October 25, 1916	July 26, 1955	Transferred to United States Forest Service
Castle Pinckney National Monument	August 10, 1933	March 29, 1956	Transferred to South Carolina, and later sold to the Sons of Confederate Veterans; site currently inaccessible and unmaintained
Saguaro National Monument	March 1, 1933	October 4, 1994	Redesignated as Saguaro National Park
Verendrye National Monument	June 29, 1917	July 30, 1956	Transferred to North Dakota after the construction of the Garrison Dam; site currently flooded by the reservoir Lake Sakakawea
Gates of the Arctic National Monument	December 1, 1978	December 2, 1980	Renamed Gates of the Arctic National Park and Preserve
Fossil Cycad National Monument	October 21, 1922	August 1, 1956	Transferred to Bureau of Land Management because of severe vandalism to the site
Death Valley National Monument	February 11, 1933	October 31, 1994	Redesignated as Death Valley National Park
Joshua Tree National Monument	August 10, 1936	October 31, 1994	Redesignated as Joshua Tree National Park
Ackia Battlefield National Monument	August 27, 1935	August 10, 1961	Incorporated into Natchez Trace Parkway
Meriwether Lewis National Monument	February 6, 1925	August 10, 1961	Incorporated into Natchez Trace Parkway
Katmai National Monument	September 24, 1918	December 2, 1980	Renamed Katmai National Park and Preserve
Mount Olympus National Monument	March 2, 1909	June 29, 1938	Redesignated as Olympic National Park
Petrified Forest National Monument	December 8, 1906	December 9, 1962	Redesignated as Petrified Forest National Park
Lehman Caves National Monument	June 10, 1933	October 27, 1986	Abolished; incorporated into Great Basin National Park
Congaree Swamp National Monument	October 18, 1976	November 10, 2003	Redesignated as Congaree National Park
Glacier Bay National Monument	February 25, 1925	December 2, 1980	Renamed Glacier Bay National Park and Preserve
Mound City Group National Monument	January 1, 1918	January 2, 1992	Incorporated into Hopewell Culture National Historical Park
Minidoka Internment National Monument	January 17, 2001	May 8, 2008	Redesignated as Minidoka National Historic Site
Pinnacles National Monument	January 16, 1908	January 10, 2013	Redesignated as Pinnacles National Park
Andrew Johnson National Monument	April 27, 1942	December 11, 1963	Redesignated as Andrew Johnson National Historic Site
Sieur de Monts National Monument	July 8, 1916	February 26, 1919	Redesignated as Lafayette National Park (renamed Acadia National Park on January 19, 1929)
Edison Laboratory National Monument	July 14, 1956	September 5, 1962	Combined with Edison Home National Historic Site into Edison National Historic Site, later redesignated Thomas Edison National Historical Park
Wrangell–St. Elias National Monument	December 1, 1978	December 2, 1980	Renamed Wrangell–St. Elias National Park and Preserve
Badlands National Monument	January 29, 1939	November 10, 1978	Redesignated as Badlands National Park
Great Sand Dunes National Monument	March 17, 1932	September 14, 2004	Renamed Great Sand Dunes National Park and Preserve
Biscayne National Monument	October 18, 1968	June 28, 1980	Redesignated as Biscayne National Park
Fort Jefferson National Monument	January 4, 1935	October 26, 1992	Redesignated as Dry Tortugas National Park
Cinder Cone National Monument	May 6, 1907	August 9, 1916	Merged with Lassen Peak National Monument and redesignated as Lassen Volcanic National Park
Lassen Peak National Monument	May 6, 1907	August 9, 1916	Merged with Cinder Cone National Monument and redesignated as Lassen Volcanic National Park
Homestead National Monument of America	March 19, 1936	January 13, 2021	Redesignated as Homestead National Historical Park

== National preserves ==
There are 21 national preserves in the United States, 19 of which are counted by the National Park System as official units. Ten are stand-alone official units, while eleven others are designated areas where hunting or grazing is permitted as part of a larger "national park and preserve" or "national monument and preserve". Nine of those are counted as separate units, while Oregon Caves National Monument and Preserve and New River Gorge National Park and Preserve are single units (there is no functional difference). Jean Lafitte National Historical Park and Preserve is not officially a national preserve but has similar management policies, while Salt River Bay National Historical Park and Ecological Preserve is unrelated.

Name	Location	Area (2026)
Aniakchak National Monument and Preserve	Alaska	464,117.93 acres (1,878.2186 km^{2})
Bering Land Bridge National Preserve	Alaska	2,697,391.01 acres (10,915.9541 km^{2})
Big Cypress National Preserve	Florida	720,564.01 acres (2,916.0191 km^{2})
Big Thicket National Preserve	Texas	113,121.96 acres (457.7883 km^{2})
Craters of the Moon National Monument and Preserve	Idaho	698,939.69 acres (2,828.5086 km^{2})
Denali National Park and Preserve	Alaska	1,334,117.80 acres (5,398.9832 km^{2})
Gates of the Arctic National Park and Preserve	Alaska	948,608.07 acres (3,838.8807 km^{2})
Glacier Bay National Park and Preserve	Alaska	58,406.00 acres (236.3607 km^{2})
Great Sand Dunes National Park and Preserve	Colorado	41,686.00 acres (168.6973 km^{2})
Katmai National Park and Preserve	Alaska	418,698.80 acres (1,694.4139 km^{2})
Lake Clark National Park and Preserve	Alaska	1,410,293.68 acres (5,707.2560 km^{2})
Little River Canyon National Preserve	Alabama	15,293.88 acres (61.8921 km^{2})
Mojave National Preserve	California	1,549,966.02 acres (6,272.4899 km^{2})
New River Gorge National Park and Preserve (not a separate unit)	West Virginia	65,165 acres (263.71 km^{2})
Noatak National Preserve	Alaska	6,587,071.39 acres (26,656.9322 km^{2})
Oregon Caves National Monument and Preserve (not a separate unit)	Oregon	4,070 acres (16.5 km^{2})
Tallgrass Prairie National Preserve	Kansas	10,882.67 acres (44.0406 km^{2})
Timucuan Ecological and Historic Preserve	Florida	46,262.76 acres (187.2187 km^{2})
Valles Caldera National Preserve	New Mexico	89,831.84 acres (363.5366 km^{2})
Wrangell–St. Elias National Park and Preserve	Alaska	4,852,644.89 acres (19,637.9571 km^{2})
Yukon–Charley Rivers National Preserve	Alaska	2,526,512.44 acres (10,224.4331 km^{2})

== National historical parks ==
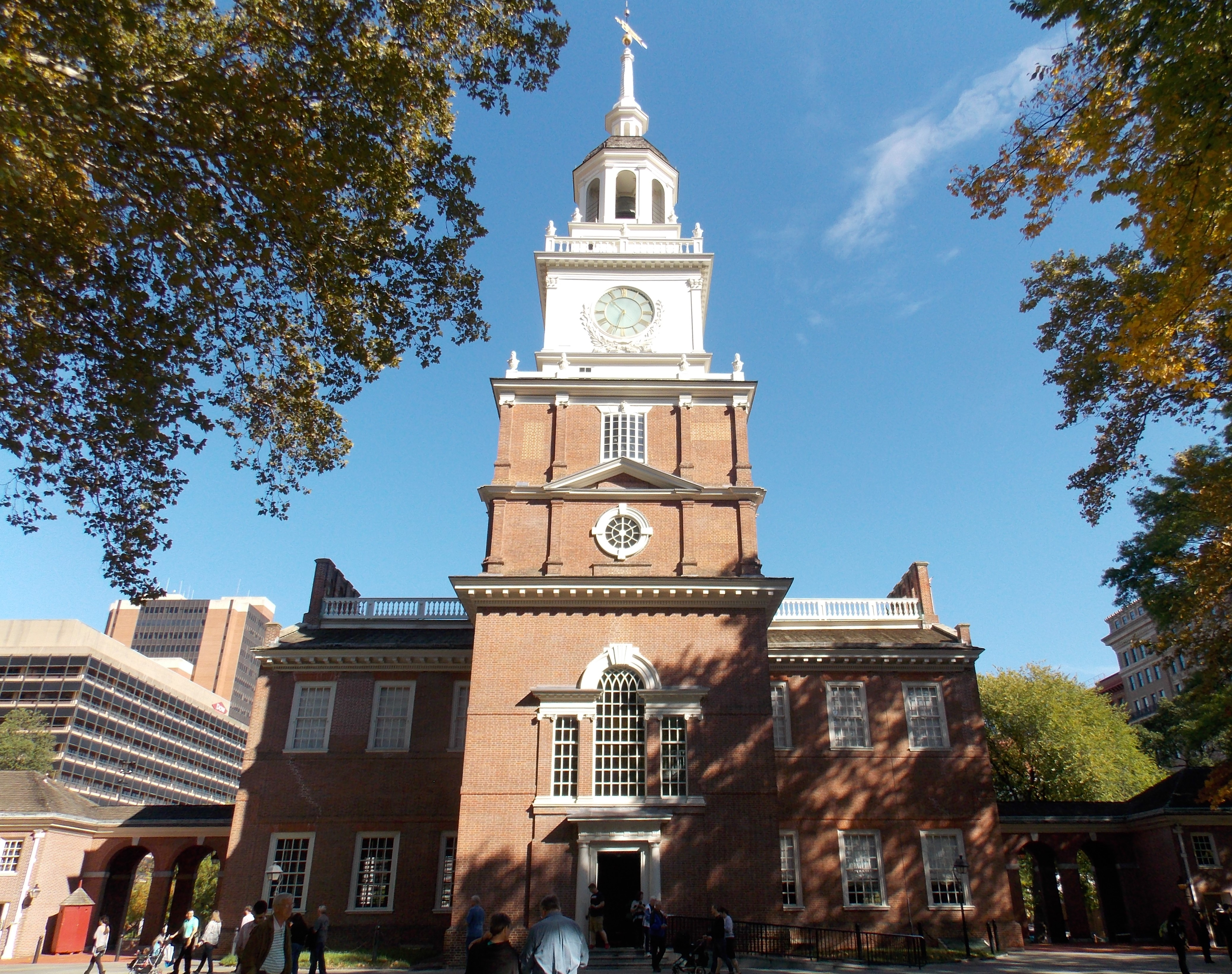
The bell tower atop Independence Hall, where the Liberty Bell once was based, in Independence National Historical Park in Philadelphia

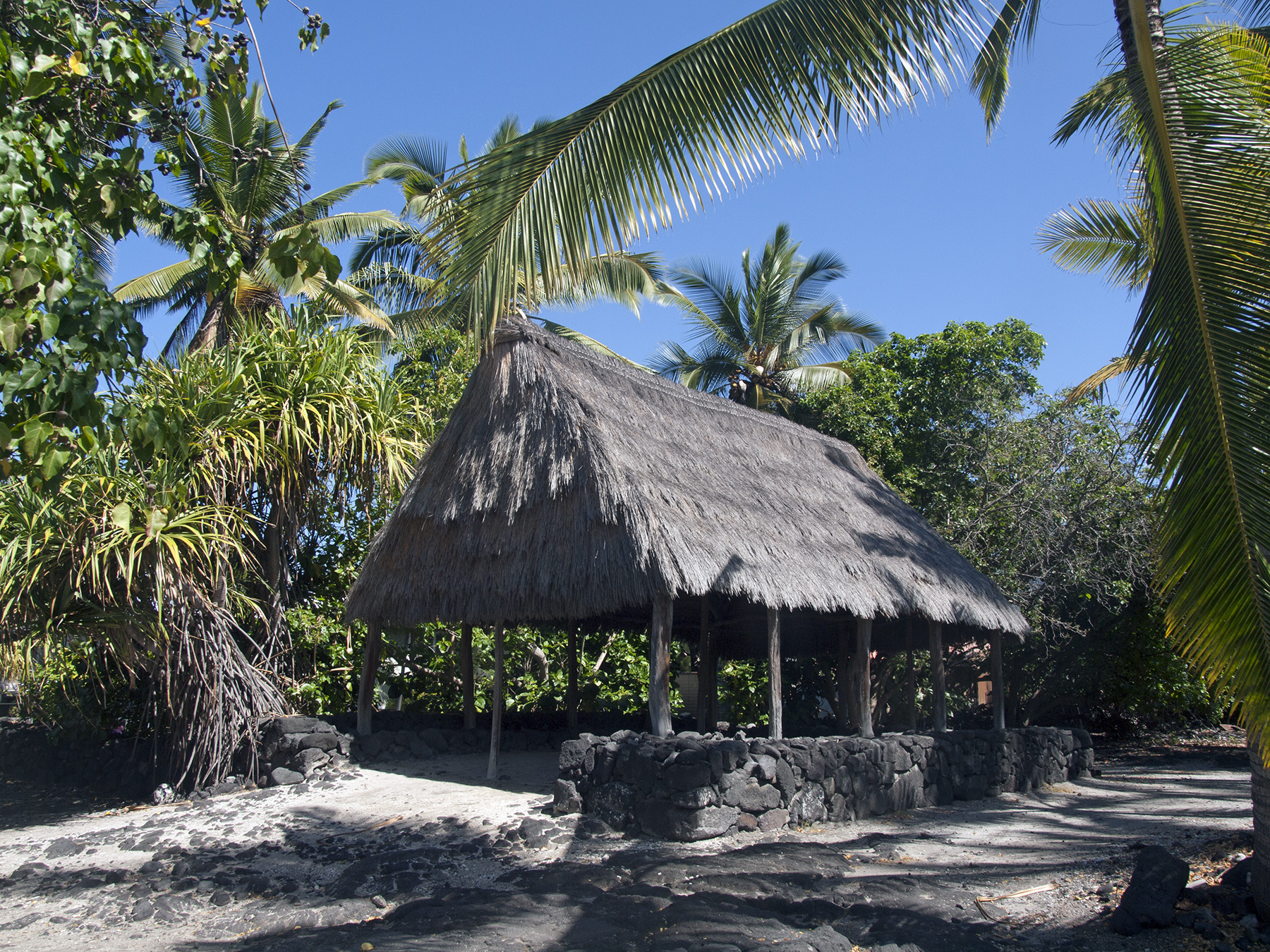
Puʻuhonua o Hōnaunau National Historical Park

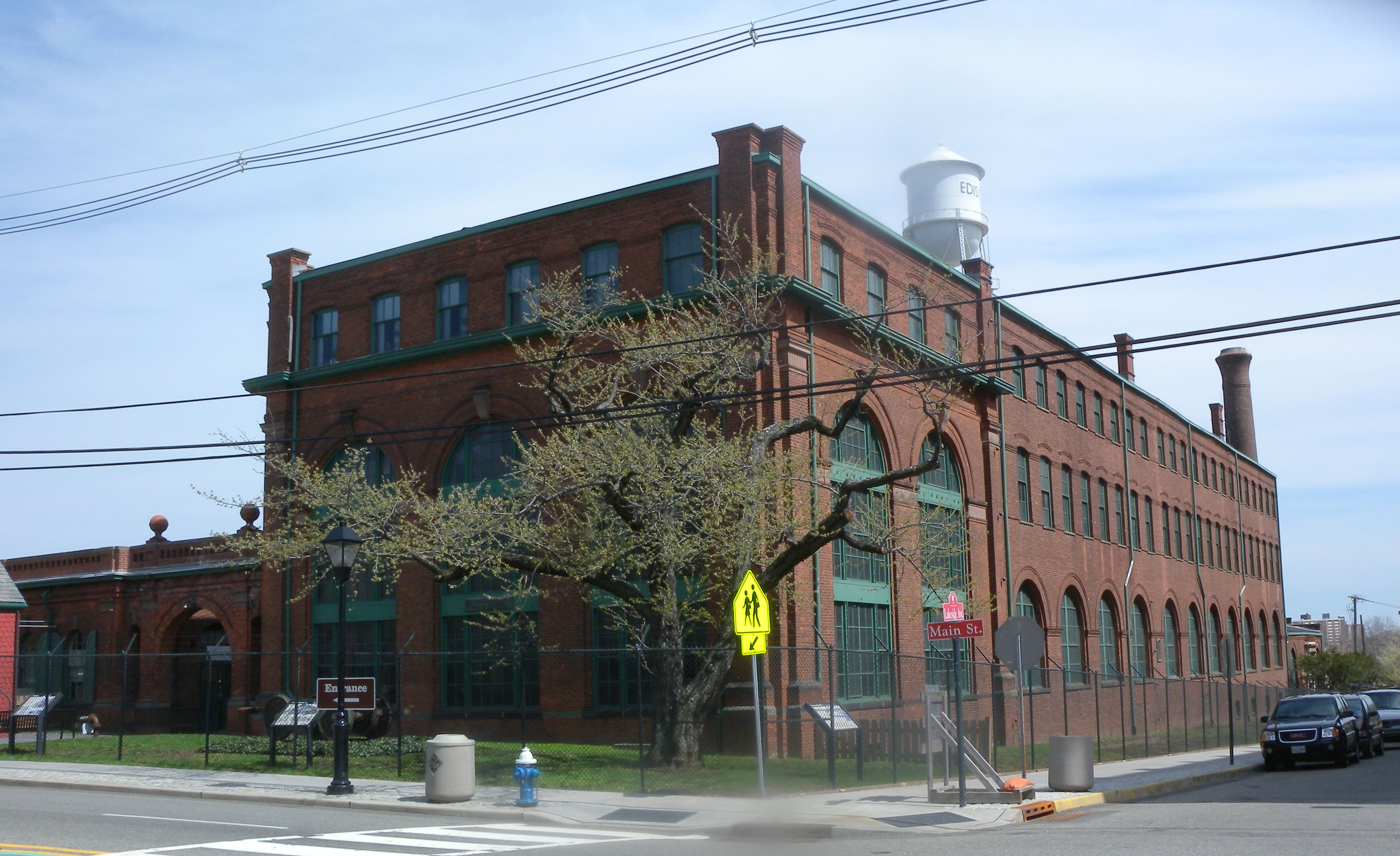
Laboratory building at Thomas Edison National Historical Park

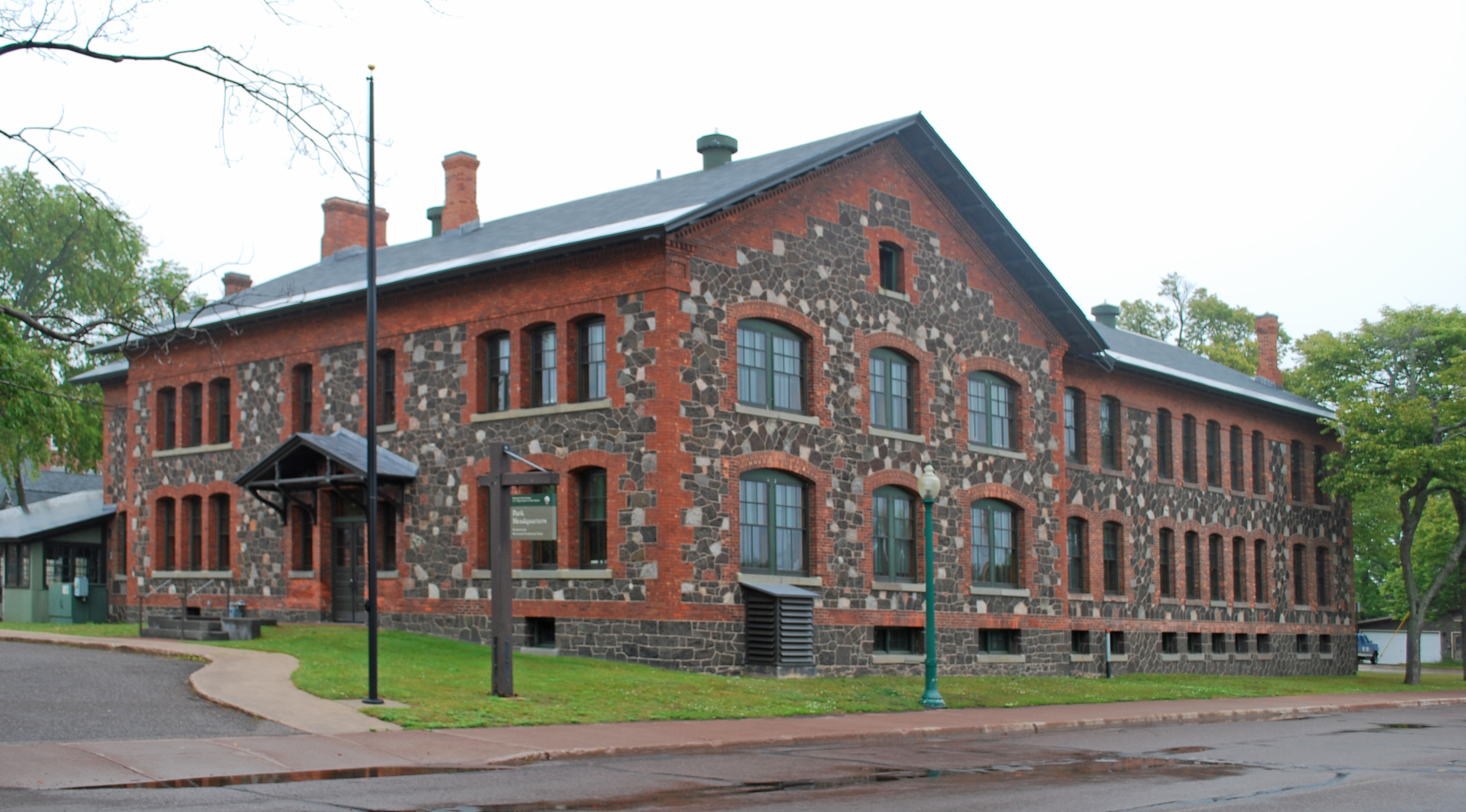
Keweenaw National Historical Park

There are 64 national historical parks.

Name	Location	Area (2026)
Abraham Lincoln Birthplace National Historical Park	Kentucky	344.50 acres (1.3941 km^{2})
Adams National Historical Park	Massachusetts	23.82 acres (0.0964 km^{2})
Appomattox Court House National Historical Park	Virginia	1,774.60 acres (7.1816 km^{2})
Blackstone River Valley National Historical Park	Rhode Island, Massachusetts	1,489.00 acres (6.0258 km^{2})
Boston National Historical Park	Massachusetts	43.82 acres (0.1773 km^{2})
Brown v. Board of Education National Historical Park	Kansas, South Carolina	3.15 acres (0.0127 km^{2})
Cane River Creole National Historical Park	Louisiana	235.37 acres (0.9525 km^{2})
Cedar Creek and Belle Grove National Historical Park	Virginia	3,707.70 acres (15.0045 km^{2})
Chaco Culture National Historical Park	New Mexico	33,960.19 acres (137.4320 km^{2})
Chesapeake and Ohio Canal National Historical Park	District of Columbia, Maryland, West Virginia	19,630.99 acres (79.4438 km^{2})
Colonial National Historical Park: Cape Henry Memorial; The Colonial Parkway; Green Spring Plantation; Most of Jamestown Island; Swann's Point (Across the James River from Jamestown Island); Tyandall's Point Park (Across the York River from Yorktown); Yorktown Battlefield	Virginia	8,675.04 acres (35.1066 km^{2})
Cumberland Gap National Historical Park	Kentucky, Tennessee, Virginia	24,546.83 acres (99.3375 km^{2})
Dayton Aviation Heritage National Historical Park	Ohio	110.53 acres (0.4473 km^{2})
First State National Historical Park	Delaware, Pennsylvania	1,409.22 acres (5.7029 km^{2})
Fort Sumter and Fort Moultrie National Historical Park	South Carolina	232.52 acres (0.9410 km^{2})
George Rogers Clark National Historical Park	Indiana	26.17 acres (0.1059 km^{2})
Golden Spike National Historical Park	Utah	2,735.28 acres (11.0693 km^{2})
Harpers Ferry National Historical Park	West Virginia, Virginia, Maryland	3,666.21 acres (14.8366 km^{2})
Harriet Tubman National Historical Park	New York	31.50 acres (0.1275 km^{2})
Harriet Tubman Underground Railroad National Historical Park	Maryland	480.00 acres (1.9425 km^{2})
Homestead National Historical Park	Nebraska	210.45 acres (0.8517 km^{2})
Hopewell Culture National Historical Park	Ohio	1,775.78 acres (7.1863 km^{2})
Independence National Historical Park: Germantown White House; Independence Hall; National Constitution Center (partner site); Thaddeus Kosciuszko National Memorial	Pennsylvania	44.87 acres (0.1816 km^{2})
Jean Lafitte National Historical Park and Preserve: Chalmette National Cemetery	Louisiana	25,875.40 acres (104.7140 km^{2})
Jimmy Carter National Historical Park	Georgia	78.35 acres (0.3171 km^{2})
Kalaupapa National Historical Park	Hawaii	10,778.88 acres (43.6206 km^{2})
Kaloko-Honokōhau National Historical Park	Hawaii	1,163.05 acres (4.7067 km^{2})
Keweenaw National Historical Park	Michigan	1,870.00 acres (7.5676 km^{2})
Klondike Gold Rush National Historical Park (part of Klondike Gold Rush International Historical Park)	Alaska, Washington	12,996.49 acres (52.5949 km^{2})
Lewis and Clark National Historical Park	Oregon, Washington	3,409.28 acres (13.7969 km^{2})
Lowell National Historical Park	Massachusetts	138.72 acres (0.5614 km^{2})
Lyndon B. Johnson National Historical Park	Texas	1,571.75 acres (6.3606 km^{2})
Manhattan Project National Historical Park	New Mexico, Tennessee, Washington	113.61 acres (0.4598 km^{2})
Marsh-Billings-Rockefeller National Historical Park	Vermont	643.07 acres (2.6024 km^{2})
Martin Luther King Jr. National Historical Park	Georgia	39.17 acres (0.1585 km^{2})
Minute Man National Historical Park	Massachusetts	1,027.76 acres (4.1592 km^{2})
Morristown National Historical Park	New Jersey	1,710.72 acres (6.9230 km^{2})
Natchez National Historical Park	Mississippi	122.22 acres (0.4946 km^{2})
New Bedford Whaling National Historical Park	Massachusetts	34.00 acres (0.1376 km^{2})
New Orleans Jazz National Historical Park	Louisiana	5.13 acres (0.0208 km^{2})
Nez Perce National Historical Park	Idaho, Montana, Oregon, Washington	4,564.93 acres (18.4736 km^{2})
Ocmulgee Mounds National Historical Park	Georgia	3,444.32 acres (13.9387 km^{2})
Palo Alto Battlefield National Historical Park	Texas	3,426.87 acres (13.8681 km^{2})
Paterson Great Falls National Historical Park	New Jersey	51.34 acres (0.2078 km^{2})
Pecos National Historical Park	New Mexico	6,885.87 acres (27.8661 km^{2})
Pullman National Historical Park	Illinois	203.48 acres (0.8235 km^{2})
Puʻuhonua o Hōnaunau National Historical Park	Hawaii	419.80 acres (1.6989 km^{2})
Reconstruction Era National Historical Park	South Carolina	64.99 acres (0.2630 km^{2})
Rosie the Riveter/World War II Home Front National Historical Park	California	145.19 acres (0.5876 km^{2})
Saint-Gaudens National Historical Park	New Hampshire	190.75 acres (0.7719 km^{2})
Salem Maritime National Historical Park	Massachusetts	9.02 acres (0.0365 km^{2})
Ste. Genevieve National Historical Park	Missouri	17.47 acres (0.0707 km^{2})
Salt River Bay National Historical Park and Ecological Preserve	U.S. Virgin Islands	989.42 acres (4.0040 km^{2})
San Antonio Missions National Historical Park	Texas	990.28 acres (4.0075 km^{2})
San Francisco Maritime National Historical Park	California	49.86 acres (0.2018 km^{2})
San Juan Island National Historical Park	Washington	2,145.56 acres (8.6828 km^{2})
Saratoga National Historical Park	New York	3,607.59 acres (14.5994 km^{2})
Sitka National Historical Park	Alaska	116.29 acres (0.4706 km^{2})
Thomas Edison National Historical Park	New Jersey	21.25 acres (0.0860 km^{2})
Tumacácori National Historical Park	Arizona	360.32 acres (1.4582 km^{2})
Valley Forge National Historical Park	Pennsylvania	3,468.54 acres (14.0367 km^{2})
War in the Pacific National Historical Park	Guam	2,030.30 acres (8.2163 km^{2})
Weir Farm National Historical Park	Connecticut	69.73 acres (0.2822 km^{2})
Women's Rights National Historical Park	New York	7.44 acres (0.0301 km^{2})

=== Authorized national historical parks ===
Name	Status
Coltsville National Historical Park	Connecticut (pending acquisition of property)

== National historic sites ==
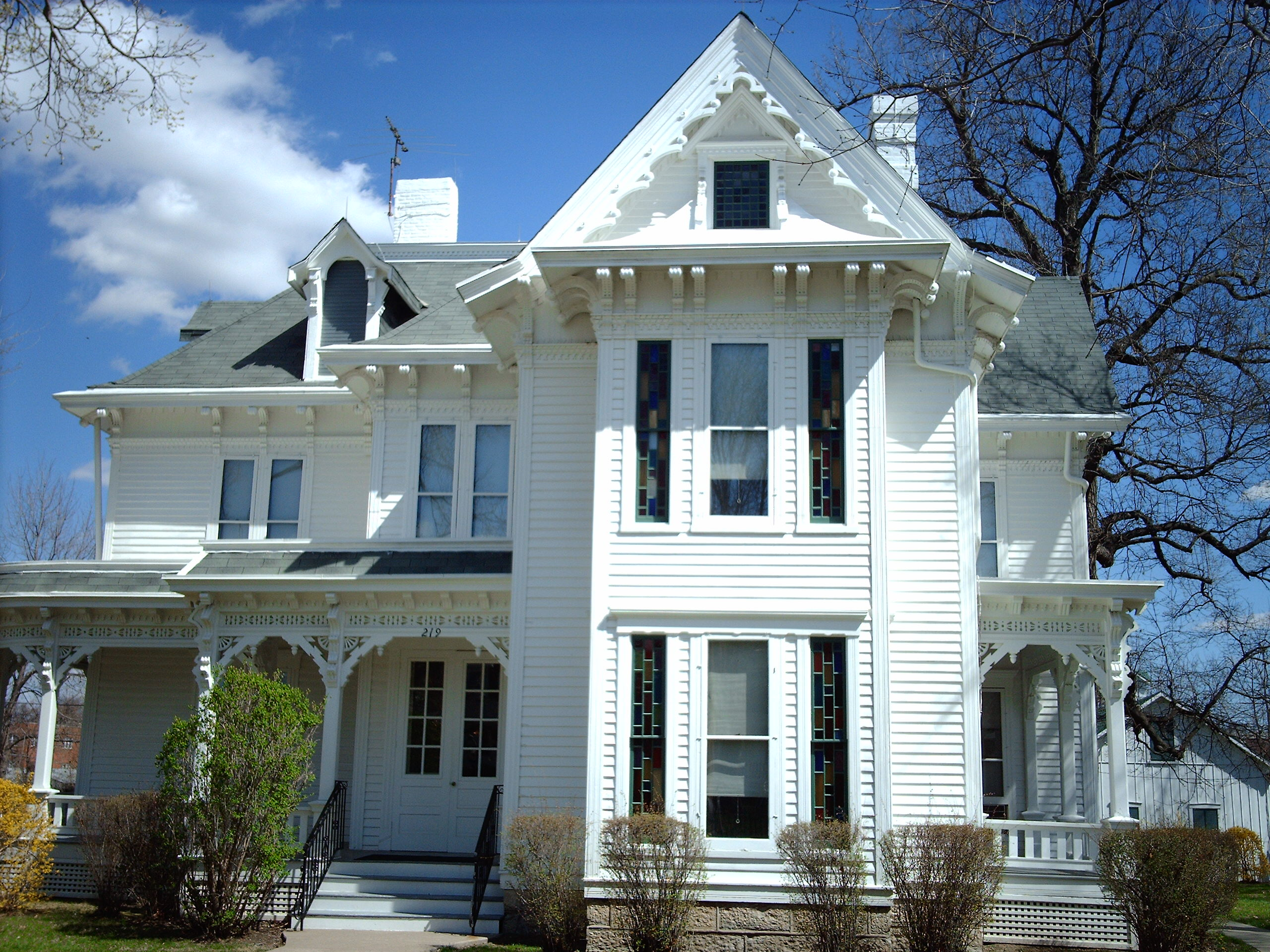
Harry S Truman National Historic Site

Knife River Indian Villages National Historic Site

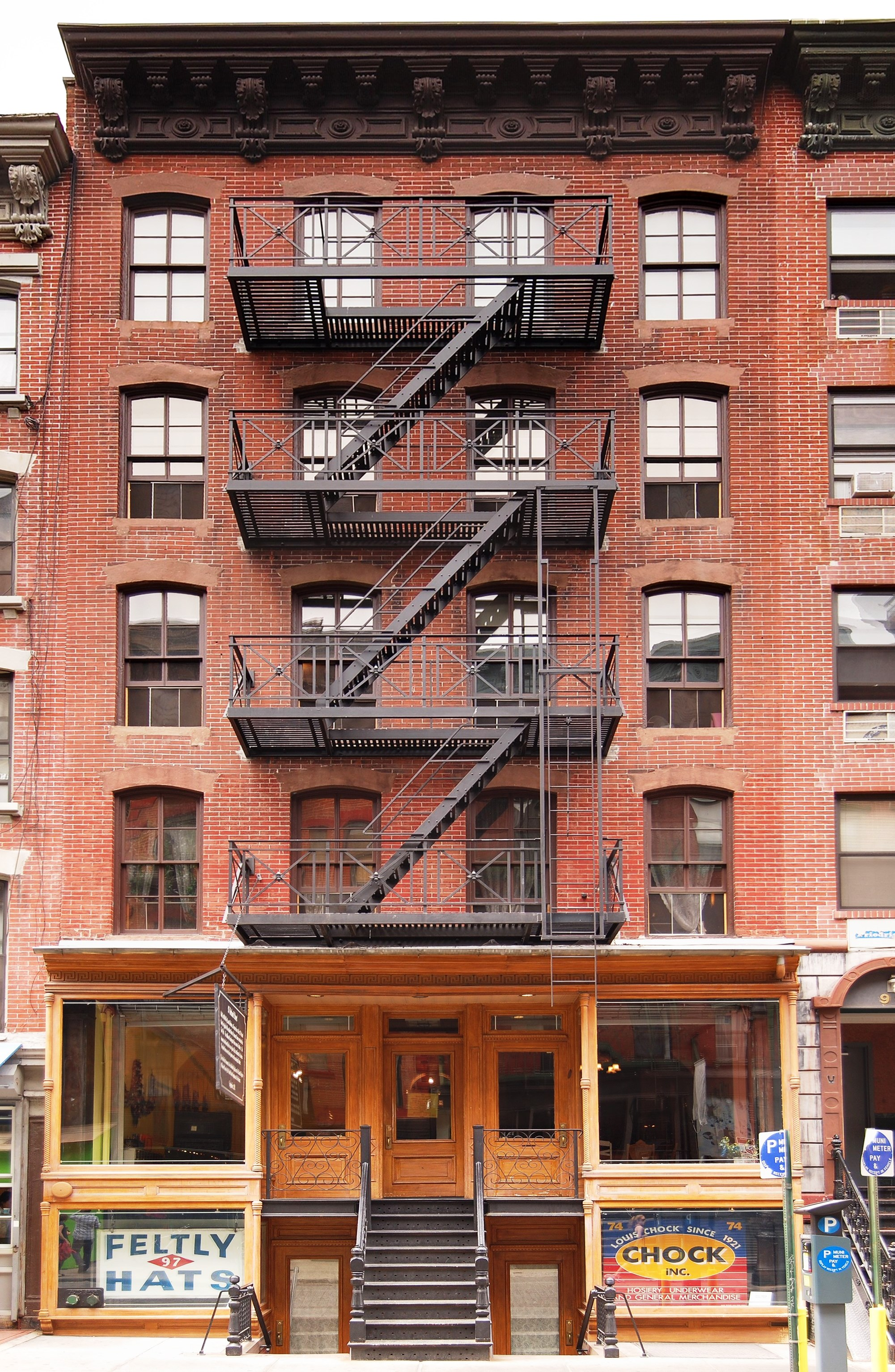
Lower East Side Tenement National Historic Site

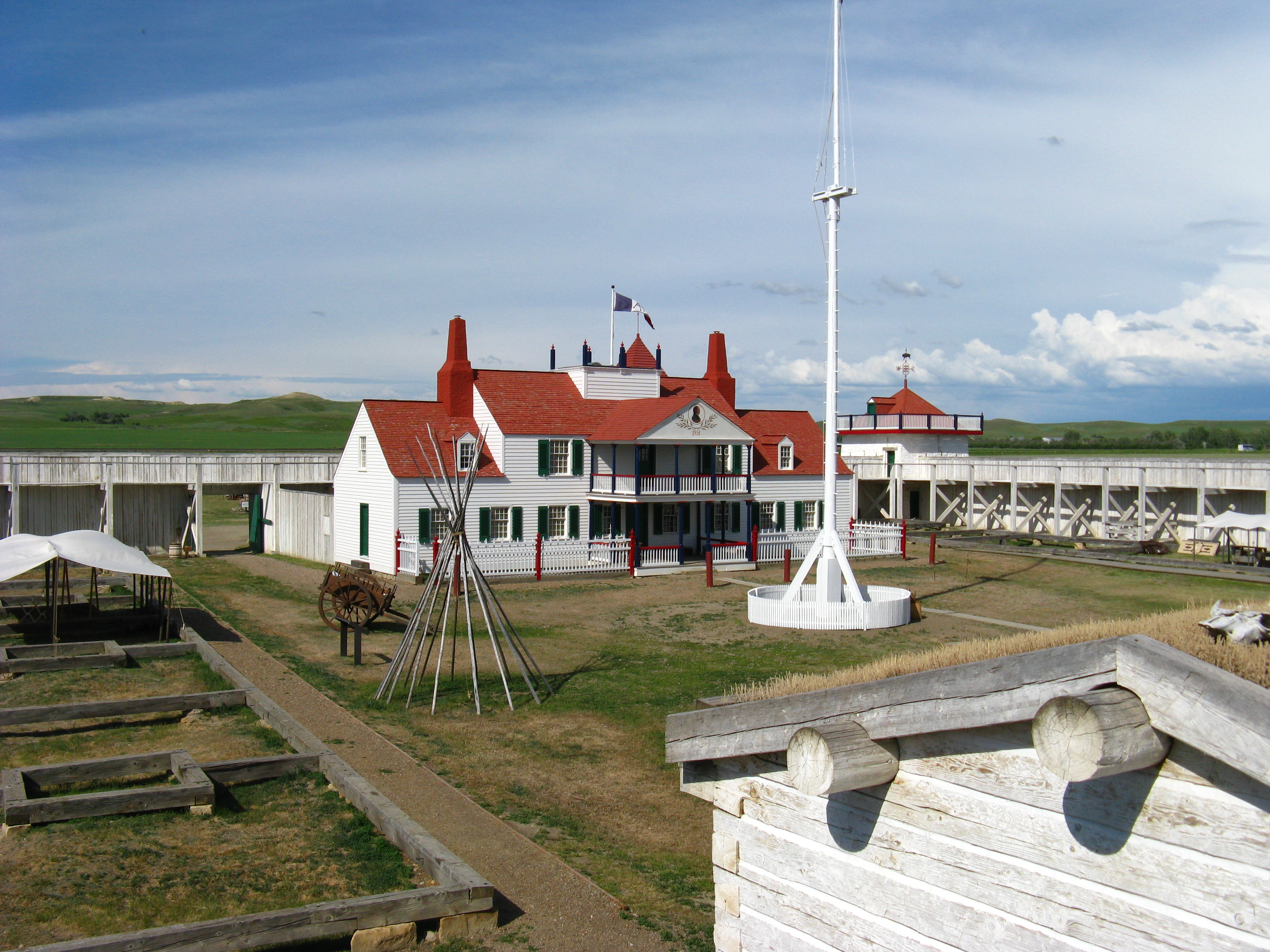
Fort Union Trading Post National Historic Site

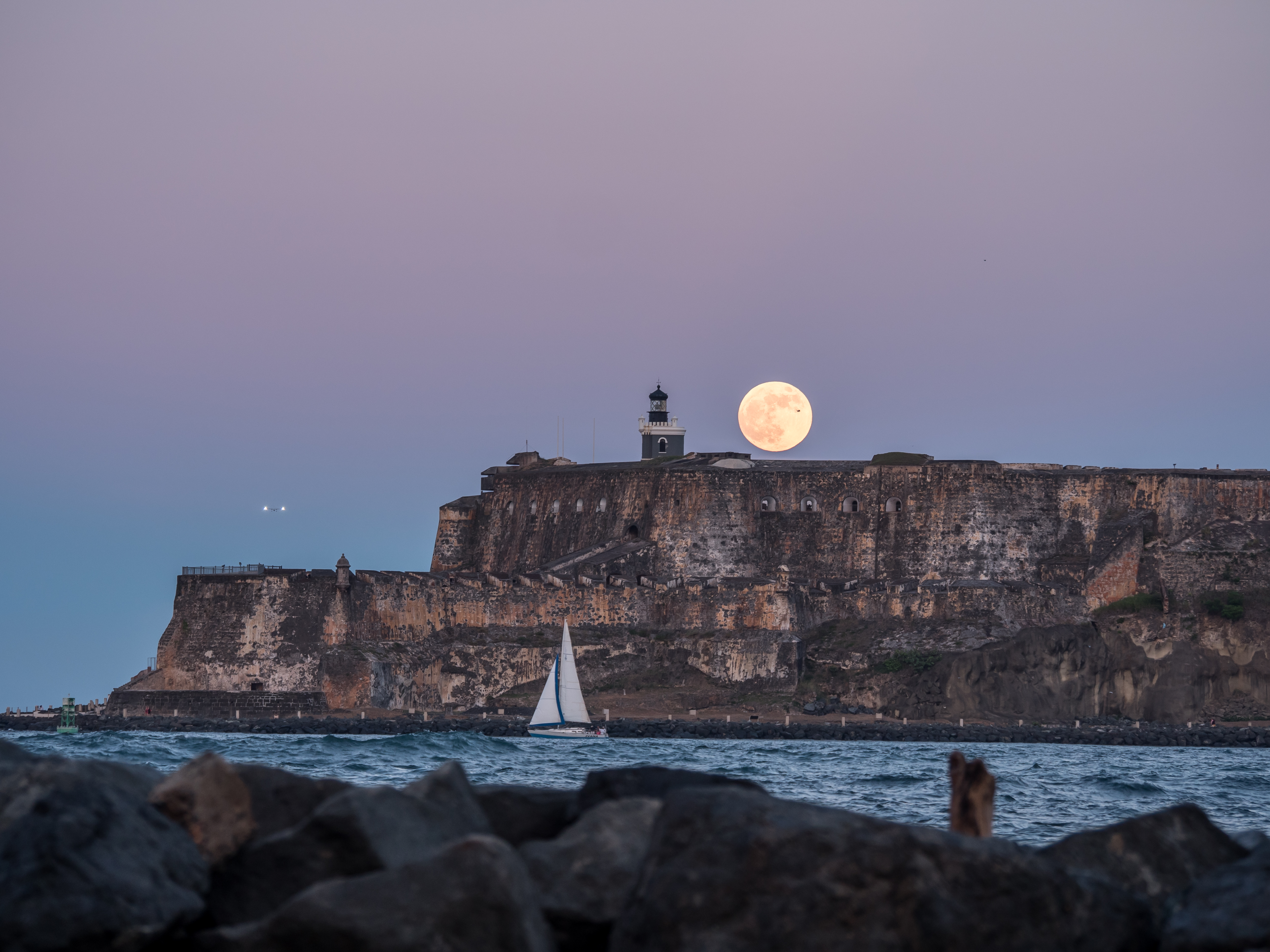
Castillo San Felipe del Morro at San Juan National Historic Site

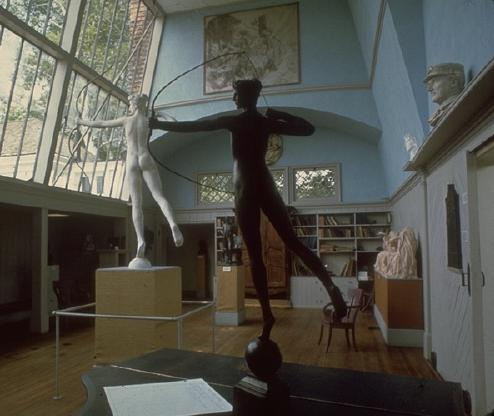
Saint-Gaudens National Historical Park

There are 85 national historic sites, of which 75 are NPS units, 9 are affiliated areas, and one, Grey Towers National Historic Site, is managed by the U.S. Forest Service (not listed here).

Name	Location	Area (2026)
Allegheny Portage Railroad National Historic Site	Pennsylvania	1,284.27 acres (5.1973 km^{2})
Amache National Historic Site	Colorado	472.59 acres (1.9125 km^{2})
Andersonville National Historic Site: Andersonville National Cemetery	Georgia	515.61 acres (2.0866 km^{2})
Andrew Johnson National Historic Site: Andrew Johnson National Cemetery	Tennessee	16.68 acres (0.0675 km^{2})
Bent's Old Fort National Historic Site	Colorado	798.54 acres (3.2316 km^{2})
Blackwell School National Historic Site	Texas	0.77 acres (0.0031 km^{2})
Boston African American National Historic Site	Massachusetts	0.59 acres (0.0024 km^{2})
Carl Sandburg Home National Historic Site	North Carolina	268.49 acres (1.0865 km^{2})
Carter G. Woodson Home National Historic Site	District of Columbia	0.15 acres (0.00061 km^{2})
Charles Pinckney National Historic Site	South Carolina	28.45 acres (0.1151 km^{2})
Chicago Portage National Historic Site (affiliated area)	Illinois	91.20 acres (0.3691 km^{2})
Chimney Rock National Historic Site (affiliated area)	Nebraska	83.36 acres (0.3373 km^{2})
Christiansted National Historic Site	U.S. Virgin Islands	27.15 acres (0.1099 km^{2})
Clara Barton National Historic Site	Maryland	8.59 acres (0.0348 km^{2})
Edgar Allan Poe National Historic Site	Pennsylvania	0.52 acres (0.0021 km^{2})
Eisenhower National Historic Site	Pennsylvania	690.46 acres (2.7942 km^{2})
Eleanor Roosevelt National Historic Site	New York	180.50 acres (0.7305 km^{2})
Eugene O'Neill National Historic Site	California	13.19 acres (0.0534 km^{2})
Fallen Timbers Battlefield and Fort Miamis National Historic Site (affiliated area)	Ohio	185.00 acres (0.7487 km^{2})
First Ladies National Historic Site	Ohio	0.46 acres (0.0019 km^{2})
Ford's Theatre National Historic Site	District of Columbia	0.30 acres (0.0012 km^{2})
Fort Bowie National Historic Site	Arizona	1,000.00 acres (4.0469 km^{2})
Fort Davis National Historic Site	Texas	523.00 acres (2.1165 km^{2})
Fort Laramie National Historic Site	Wyoming	873.11 acres (3.5334 km^{2})
Fort Larned National Historic Site	Kansas	718.39 acres (2.9072 km^{2})
Fort Point National Historic Site	California	29.00 acres (0.1174 km^{2})
Fort Raleigh National Historic Site	North Carolina	515.73 acres (2.0871 km^{2})
Fort Scott National Historic Site	Kansas	20.08 acres (0.0813 km^{2})
Fort Smith National Historic Site	Arkansas, Oklahoma	75.00 acres (0.3035 km^{2})
Fort Union Trading Post National Historic Site	Montana, North Dakota	440.14 acres (1.7812 km^{2})
Fort Vancouver National Historic Site: Fort Vancouver; McLoughlin House; Vancouver National Historic Reserve	Washington, Oregon	208.39 acres (0.8433 km^{2})
Frederick Douglass National Historic Site	District of Columbia	8.57 acres (0.0347 km^{2})
Frederick Law Olmsted National Historic Site	Massachusetts	7.21 acres (0.0292 km^{2})
Friendship Hill National Historic Site	Pennsylvania	674.56 acres (2.7298 km^{2})
Gloria Dei (Old Swedes') Church National Historic Site (affiliated area)	Pennsylvania	3.71 acres (0.0150 km^{2})
Grant-Kohrs Ranch National Historic Site	Montana	1,618.43 acres (6.5496 km^{2})
Hampton National Historic Site	Maryland	62.04 acres (0.2511 km^{2})
Harry S. Truman National Historic Site	Missouri	13.67 acres (0.0553 km^{2})
Herbert Hoover National Historic Site	Iowa	186.80 acres (0.7560 km^{2})
Home of Franklin D. Roosevelt National Historic Site	New York	838.43 acres (3.3930 km^{2})
Honouliuli National Historic Site	Hawaii	154.46 acres (0.6251 km^{2})
Hopewell Furnace National Historic Site	Pennsylvania	848.06 acres (3.4320 km^{2})
Hubbell Trading Post National Historic Site	Arizona	160.09 acres (0.6479 km^{2})
James A. Garfield National Historic Site	Ohio	7.82 acres (0.0316 km^{2})
Jamestown National Historic Site (affiliated area)	Virginia	21.99 acres (0.0890 km^{2})
John Fitzgerald Kennedy National Historic Site	Massachusetts	0.09 acres (0.00036 km^{2})
John Muir National Historic Site	California	388.50 acres (1.5722 km^{2})
Kate Mullany National Historic Site (affiliated area)	New York	0.06 acres (0.00024 km^{2})
Knife River Indian Villages National Historic Site	North Dakota	1,751.00 acres (7.0860 km^{2})
Lincoln Home National Historic Site	Illinois	12.24 acres (0.0495 km^{2})
Little Rock Central High School National Historic Site	Arkansas	28.22 acres (0.1142 km^{2})
Longfellow House–Washington's Headquarters National Historic Site	Massachusetts	1.98 acres (0.0080 km^{2})
Lower East Side Tenement National Historic Site (affiliated area)	New York	1.20 acres (0.0049 km^{2})
Maggie L. Walker National Historic Site	Virginia	1.29 acres (0.0052 km^{2})
Manzanar National Historic Site	California	813.81 acres (3.2934 km^{2})
Martin Van Buren National Historic Site	New York	284.93 acres (1.1531 km^{2})
Mary McLeod Bethune Council House National Historic Site	District of Columbia	0.07 acres (0.00028 km^{2})
Minidoka National Historic Site	Idaho	396.30 acres (1.6038 km^{2})
Minuteman Missile National Historic Site	South Dakota	43.80 acres (0.1773 km^{2})
New Philadelphia National Historic Site	Illinois	124.05 acres (0.5020 km^{2})
Nicodemus National Historic Site	Kansas	5.61 acres (0.0227 km^{2})
Ninety Six National Historic Site	South Carolina	1,021.94 acres (4.1356 km^{2})
Pennsylvania Avenue National Historic Site	District of Columbia	17.61 acres (0.0713 km^{2})
President William Jefferson Clinton Birthplace Home National Historic Site	Arkansas	0.68 acres (0.0028 km^{2})
Puʻukoholā Heiau National Historic Site	Hawaii	86.24 acres (0.3490 km^{2})
Sagamore Hill National Historic Site	New York	83.02 acres (0.3360 km^{2})
Saint Paul's Church National Historic Site	New York	6.13 acres (0.0248 km^{2})
San Juan National Historic Site	Puerto Rico	75.13 acres (0.3040 km^{2})
Sand Creek Massacre National Historic Site	Colorado	12,583.34 acres (50.9230 km^{2})
Saugus Iron Works National Historic Site	Massachusetts	8.51 acres (0.0344 km^{2})
Springfield Armory National Historic Site	Massachusetts	54.93 acres (0.2223 km^{2})
Steamtown National Historic Site	Pennsylvania	62.48 acres (0.2528 km^{2})
Theodore Roosevelt Birthplace National Historic Site	New York	0.11 acres (0.00045 km^{2})
Theodore Roosevelt Inaugural National Historic Site	New York	1.18 acres (0.0048 km^{2})
Thomas Cole National Historic Site (affiliated area)	New York	3.40 acres (0.0138 km^{2})
Thomas Stone National Historic Site	Maryland	328.25 acres (1.3284 km^{2})
Touro Synagogue National Historic Site (affiliated area)	Rhode Island	0.23 acres (0.00093 km^{2})
Tuskegee Airmen National Historic Site	Alabama	89.68 acres (0.3629 km^{2})
Tuskegee Institute National Historic Site	Alabama	57.92 acres (0.2344 km^{2})
Ulysses S. Grant National Historic Site	Missouri	9.60 acres (0.0388 km^{2})
Vanderbilt Mansion National Historic Site	New York	211.65 acres (0.8565 km^{2})
Washita Battlefield National Historic Site	Oklahoma	315.20 acres (1.2756 km^{2})
Whitman Mission National Historic Site	Washington	138.53 acres (0.5606 km^{2})
William Howard Taft National Historic Site	Ohio	3.64 acres (0.0147 km^{2})

=== Former national historic sites ===
Name	Established	Disbanded	Result
Federal Hall Memorial National Historic Site	May 26, 1939	August 11, 1955	Redesignated Federal Hall National Memorial
Atlanta Campaign National Historic Site	October 13, 1944	September 21, 1950	Transferred to state of Georgia; park never developed beyond a set of six roadside interpretive markers along the Dixie Highway
Mar-a-Lago National Historic Site	October 21, 1972	December 23, 1980	Returned to a nonprofit foundation operated by the Post family, the original owners of the site
McLoughlin House National Historic Site (affiliated unit)	June 27, 1941	July 29, 2003	Merged into Fort Vancouver National Historic Site
St. Thomas National Historic Site	December 24, 1960	February 5, 1975	Transferred to U.S. Virgin Islands; currently operated as a Virgin Islands territorial park
Salem Maritime National Historic Site	March 17, 1938	July 16, 2025	Redesignated Salem Maritime National Historical Park
Sewall-Belmont House National Historic Site	1972	April 12, 2016	Redesignated Belmont-Paul Women's Equality National Monument and changed from affiliated unit to an NPS unit
Edison Home National Historic Site	December 6, 1955	September 5, 1962	Combined with Edison Laboratory National Monument into Edison National Historic Site, later redesignated Thomas Edison National Historical Park
Edison National Historic Site	September 5, 1962	March 30, 2009	Redesignated Thomas Edison National Historical Park

=== Authorized national historic sites ===
Name	Location	Status
Ronald Reagan Boyhood Home National Historic Site	Illinois	Pending acquisition of property

== International historic site ==
Name	Location	Area (2026)
Saint Croix Island International Historic Site	Maine / New Brunswick	6.50 acres (0.0263 km^{2})

== National battlefield parks ==
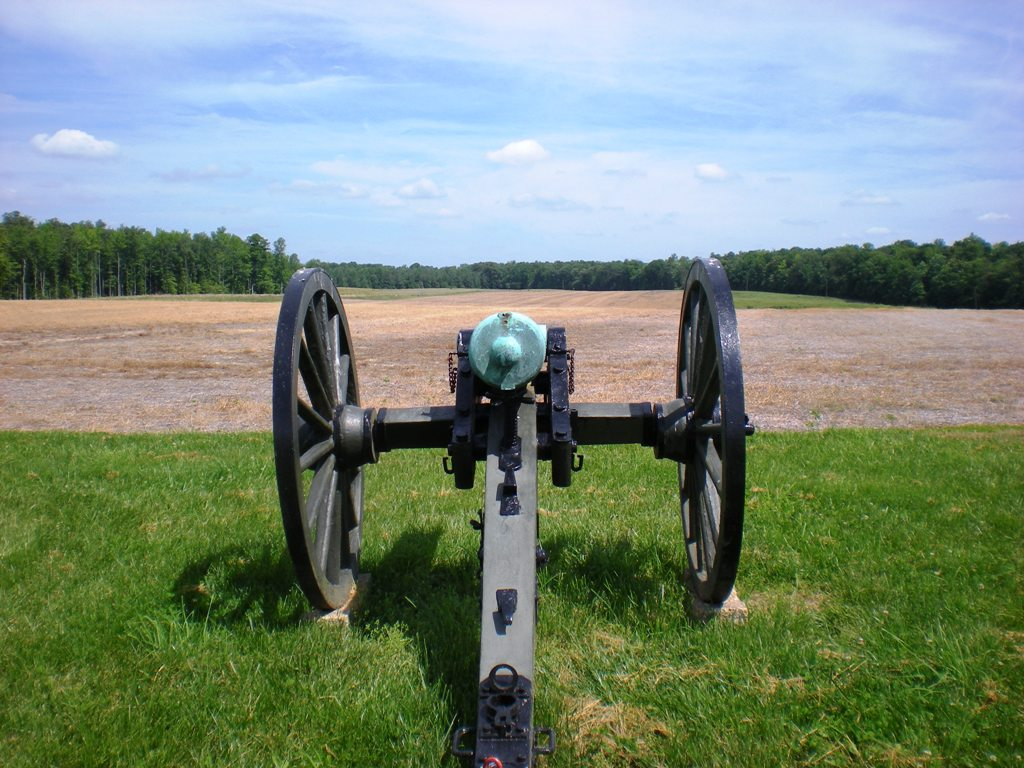
Malvern Hill, Richmond National Battlefield Park, Virginia

Name	Location	Area (2026)
Kennesaw Mountain National Battlefield Park	Georgia	2,935.10 acres (11.8779 km^{2})
Manassas National Battlefield Park	Virginia	5,086.87 acres (20.5858 km^{2})
Richmond National Battlefield Park	Virginia	8,144.28 acres (32.9587 km^{2})
River Raisin National Battlefield Park	Michigan	42.18 acres (0.1707 km^{2})

== National military parks ==
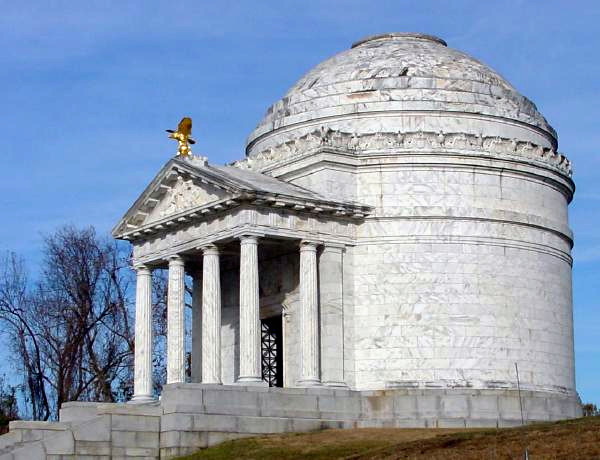
Vicksburg National Military Park

Name	Location	Area (2026)
Chickamauga and Chattanooga National Military Park	Georgia, Tennessee	9,523.48 acres (38.5402 km^{2})
Fredericksburg and Spotsylvania County Battlefields Memorial National Military Park: Fredericksburg National Cemetery	Virginia	8,585.11 acres (34.7427 km^{2})
Gettysburg National Military Park: Gettysburg National Cemetery	Pennsylvania	6,037.14 acres (24.4314 km^{2})
Guilford Courthouse National Military Park	North Carolina	254.90 acres (1.0315 km^{2})
Horseshoe Bend National Military Park	Alabama	2,040.00 acres (8.2556 km^{2})
Kings Mountain National Military Park	South Carolina	3,945.29 acres (15.9660 km^{2})
Pea Ridge National Military Park	Arkansas	4,440.82 acres (17.9714 km^{2})
Shiloh National Military Park: Shiloh National Cemetery	Tennessee, Mississippi	9,319.16 acres (37.7133 km^{2})
Vicksburg National Military Park: Vicksburg National Cemetery	Mississippi, Louisiana	3,048.27 acres (12.3359 km^{2})

=== Former national military parks ===
Name	Established	Disbanded	Result
Moore's Creek National Military Park	June 2, 1926	September 8, 1980	Redesignated as Moores Creek National Battlefield
Monocacy National Military Park	June 21, 1934	October 21, 1976	Redesignated Monocacy National Battlefield; previously Monocacy National Battlefield Site (1929 to 1934)

== National battlefields ==
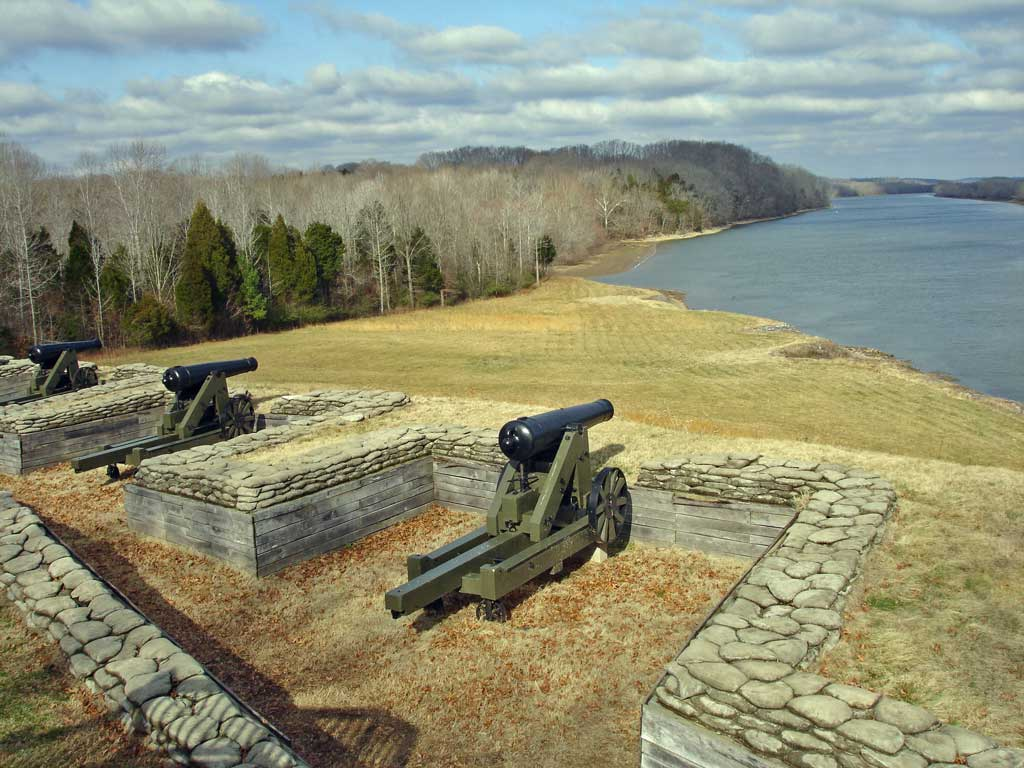
Fort Donelson National Battlefield

Name	Location	Area (2026)
Antietam National Battlefield: Antietam National Cemetery	Maryland	3,287.63 acres (13.3046 km^{2})
Big Hole National Battlefield	Montana	969.61 acres (3.9239 km^{2})
Cowpens National Battlefield	South Carolina	841.56 acres (3.4057 km^{2})
Fort Donelson National Battlefield: Fort Donelson National Cemetery	Tennessee, Kentucky	1,316.78 acres (5.3288 km^{2})
Fort Necessity National Battlefield	Pennsylvania	902.80 acres (3.6535 km^{2})
Monocacy National Battlefield	Maryland	1,647.37 acres (6.6667 km^{2})
Moores Creek National Battlefield	North Carolina	87.75 acres (0.3551 km^{2})
Petersburg National Battlefield: Poplar Grove National Cemetery	Virginia	9,620.11 acres (38.9312 km^{2})
Stones River National Battlefield: Stones River National Cemetery	Tennessee	709.49 acres (2.8712 km^{2})
Tupelo National Battlefield	Mississippi	1.00 acre (0.0040 km^{2})
Wilson's Creek National Battlefield	Missouri	2,446.75 acres (9.9016 km^{2})

== National battlefield site ==
Name	Location	Area (2026)
Brices Cross Roads National Battlefield Site	Mississippi	1.00 acre (0.0040 km^{2})

=== Former national battlefield sites ===
Name	Established	Disbanded	Result
Antietam National Battlefield Site	August 30, 1890	1978	Redesignated Antietam National Battlefield
New Orleans Battlefield Site (Chalmette Monument and Grounds)	March 4, 1907	1939	Redesignated Chalmette National Historical Park; incorporated into Jean Lafitte National Historical Park and Preserve, Nov. 10, 1978
Kennesaw Mountain National Battlefield Site	February 8, 1917	1935	Redesignated Kennesaw Mountain National Battlefield Park
White Plains National Battlefield Site	May 18, 1926	1956	Assumed by Battle of White Plains Monument Committee, 1958
Tupelo National Battlefield Site	February 21, 1929	1961	Redesignated Tupelo National Battlefield
Monocacy National Battlefield Site	March 1, 1929	June 21, 1934	Reauthorized as a national military park; redesignated Monocacy National Battlefield, Oct. 21, 1976
Cowpens National Battlefield Site	March 4, 1929	1972	Redesignated Cowpens National Battlefield
Appomattox Battlefield Site	June 18, 1930	1935	Designated Appomattox Court House National Historical Monument; redesignated Appomattox Court House National Historical Park, 1954
Fort Necessity National Battlefield Site	March 4, 1931	1961	Redesignated Fort Necessity National Battlefield

== National memorials ==
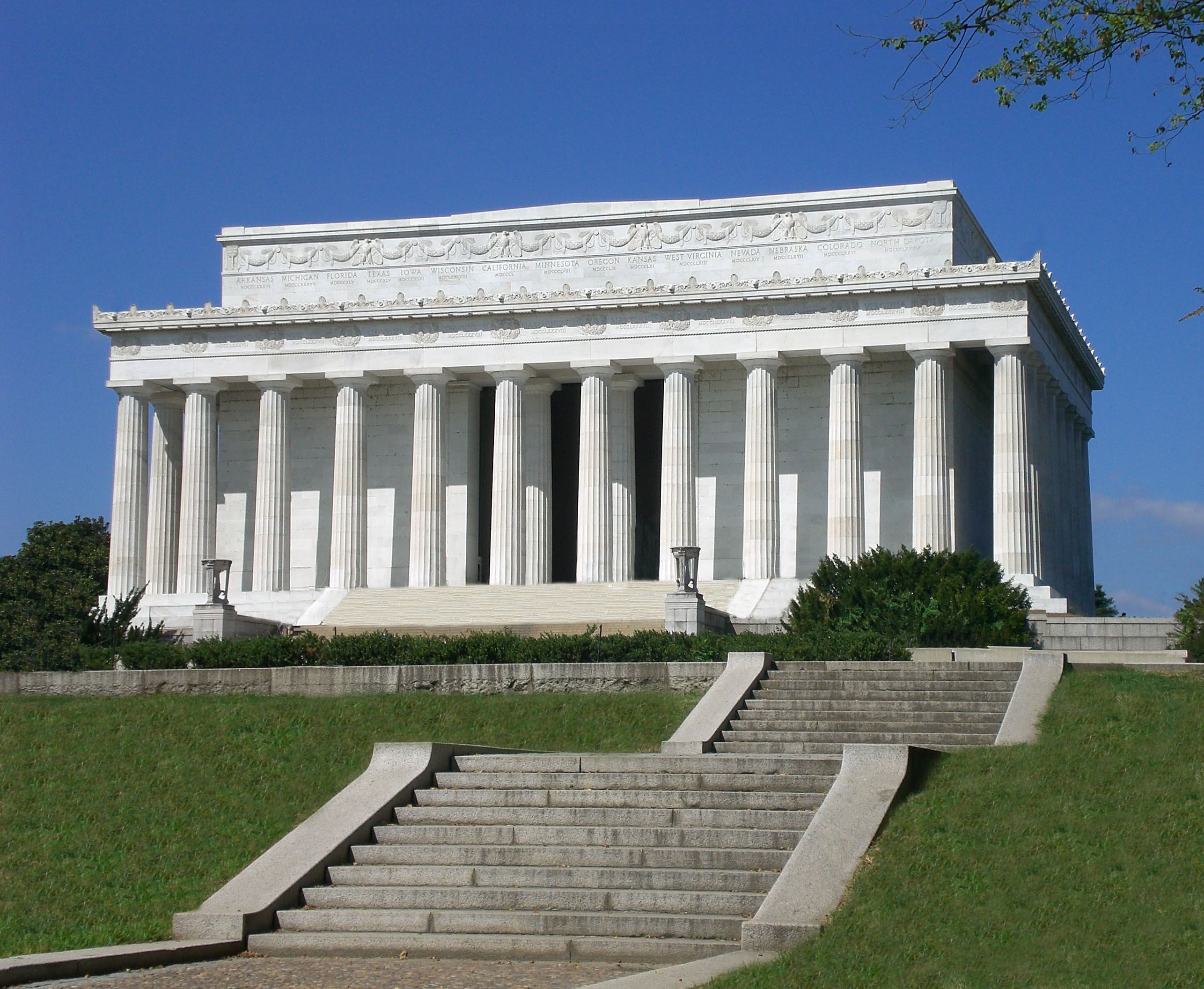
Lincoln Memorial

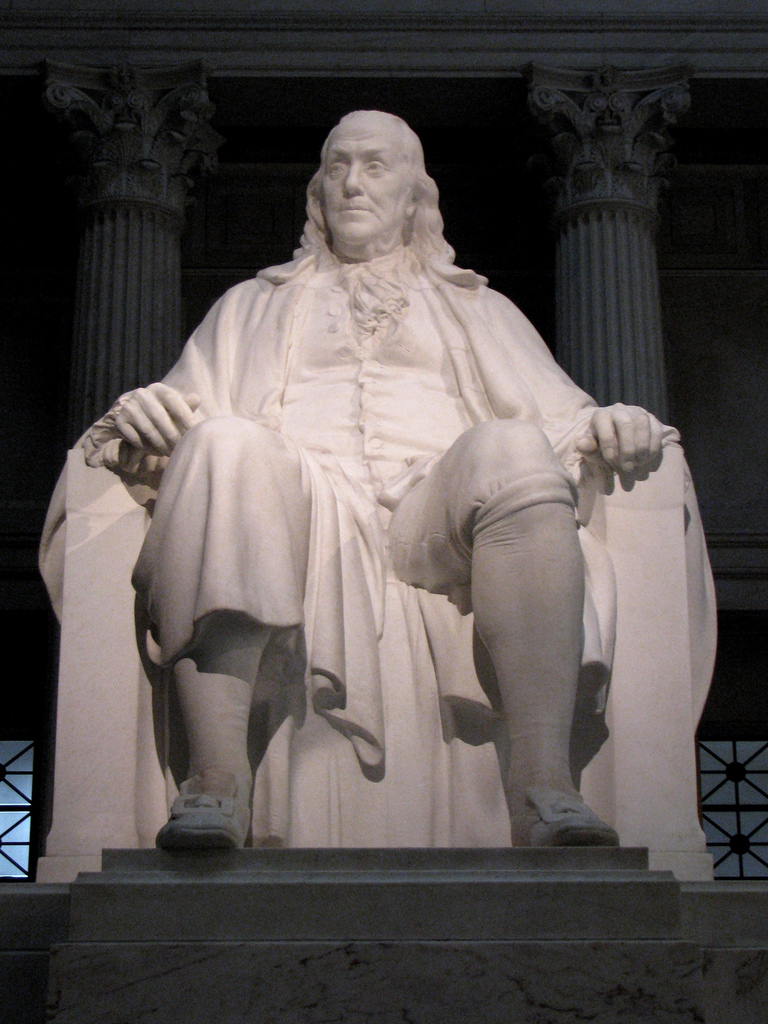
Benjamin Franklin National Memorial

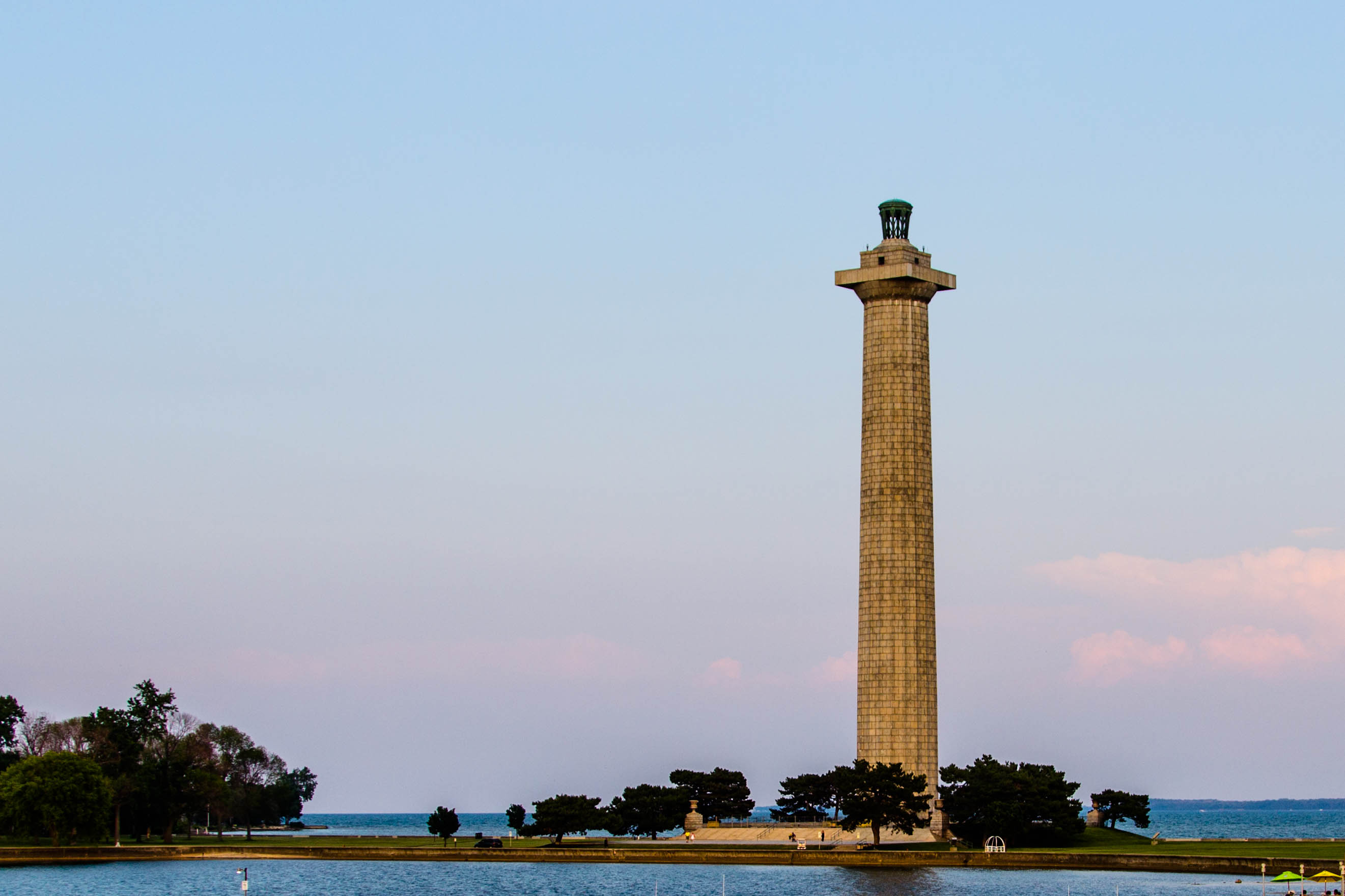
Perry's Victory and International Peace Memorial

There are 32 national memorials that are NPS units and five affiliated national memorials.

Name	Location	Area (2026)
American Memorial Park (affiliated area)	Northern Mariana Islands	133.00 acres (0.5382 km^{2})
Arkansas Post National Memorial	Arkansas	757.51 acres (3.0655 km^{2})
Arlington House, The Robert E. Lee Memorial	Virginia	17.12 acres (0.0693 km^{2})
Benjamin Franklin National Memorial (affiliated area)	Pennsylvania	0.00 acres (0 km^{2})
Chamizal National Memorial	Texas	54.54 acres (0.2207 km^{2})
Coronado National Memorial	Arizona	4,830.22 acres (19.5472 km^{2})
De Soto National Memorial	Florida	30.00 acres (0.1214 km^{2})
Desert Shield and Desert Storm Memorial	District of Columbia	
Dwight D. Eisenhower Memorial	District of Columbia	3.39 acres (0.0137 km^{2})
Father Marquette National Memorial (affiliated area)	Michigan	52.00 acres (0.2104 km^{2})
Federal Hall National Memorial	New York	0.45 acres (0.0018 km^{2})
Flight 93 National Memorial	Pennsylvania	2,262.65 acres (9.1566 km^{2})
Fort Caroline National Memorial	Florida	138.39 acres (0.5600 km^{2})
Franklin Delano Roosevelt Memorial	District of Columbia	8.14 acres (0.0329 km^{2})
General Grant National Memorial	New York	0.76 acres (0.0031 km^{2})
Hamilton Grange National Memorial	New York	1.75 acres (0.0071 km^{2})
Johnstown Flood National Memorial	Pennsylvania	177.76 acres (0.7194 km^{2})
Korean War Veterans Memorial	District of Columbia	1.56 acres (0.0063 km^{2})
Lincoln Boyhood National Memorial	Indiana	199.96 acres (0.8092 km^{2})
Lincoln Memorial	District of Columbia	7.29 acres (0.0295 km^{2})
Lyndon Baines Johnson Memorial Grove on the Potomac	District of Columbia	17.00 acres (0.0688 km^{2})
Martin Luther King, Jr. Memorial	District of Columbia	2.74 acres (0.0111 km^{2})
Mount Rushmore National Memorial	South Dakota	1,278.45 acres (5.1737 km^{2})
Oklahoma City National Memorial (affiliated area)	Oklahoma	6.24 acres (0.0253 km^{2})
Pearl Harbor National Memorial	Hawaii	21.64 acres (0.0876 km^{2})
Perry's Victory and International Peace Memorial	Ohio	25.38 acres (0.1027 km^{2})
Port Chicago Naval Magazine National Memorial	California	5.00 acres (0.0202 km^{2})
Red Hill Patrick Henry National Memorial (affiliated area)	Virginia	1,000.00 acres (4.0469 km^{2})
Roger Williams National Memorial	Rhode Island	4.56 acres (0.0185 km^{2})
Thaddeus Kosciuszko National Memorial	Pennsylvania	0.02 acres (8.1×10^{−5} km^{2})
Theodore Roosevelt Island National Memorial	District of Columbia	88.50 acres (0.3581 km^{2})
Thomas Jefferson Memorial	District of Columbia	18.36 acres (0.0743 km^{2})
Vietnam Veterans Memorial	District of Columbia	2.18 acres (0.0088 km^{2})
Washington Monument	District of Columbia	104.83 acres (0.4242 km^{2})
World War I Memorial	District of Columbia	1.39 acres (0.0056 km^{2})
World War II Memorial	District of Columbia	8.25 acres (0.0334 km^{2})
Wright Brothers National Memorial	North Carolina	428.44 acres (1.7338 km^{2})

=== Former national memorials ===
Name	Established	Disbanded	Result
Camp Blount Tablets National Memorial	1930	1944	Transferred to NPS in 1933 from War Dept., it was never developed; only a stone marker remains off U.S. Route 231 near Fayetteville, Tennessee
Fort Clatsop National Memorial	May 29, 1958	October 30, 2004	Incorporated into Lewis and Clark National and State Historical Parks
Jefferson National Expansion Memorial	December 21, 1935	February 22, 2018	Redesignated as Gateway Arch National Park
New Echota Marker National Memorial	August 10, 1933	September 21, 1950	Transferred to state of Georgia; currently operated as a Georgia state park.
Oklahoma City National Memorial	October 9, 1997	January 23, 2004	Transferred to the nonprofit Oklahoma City National Memorial Foundation; NPS interpretation continues at this affiliated unit

=== Authorized national memorials ===
Name	Law
Adams Memorial	Authorized by Public Law 107-62
National Global War on Terrorism Memorial	Authorized by Public Law 115-51

== National recreation areas ==
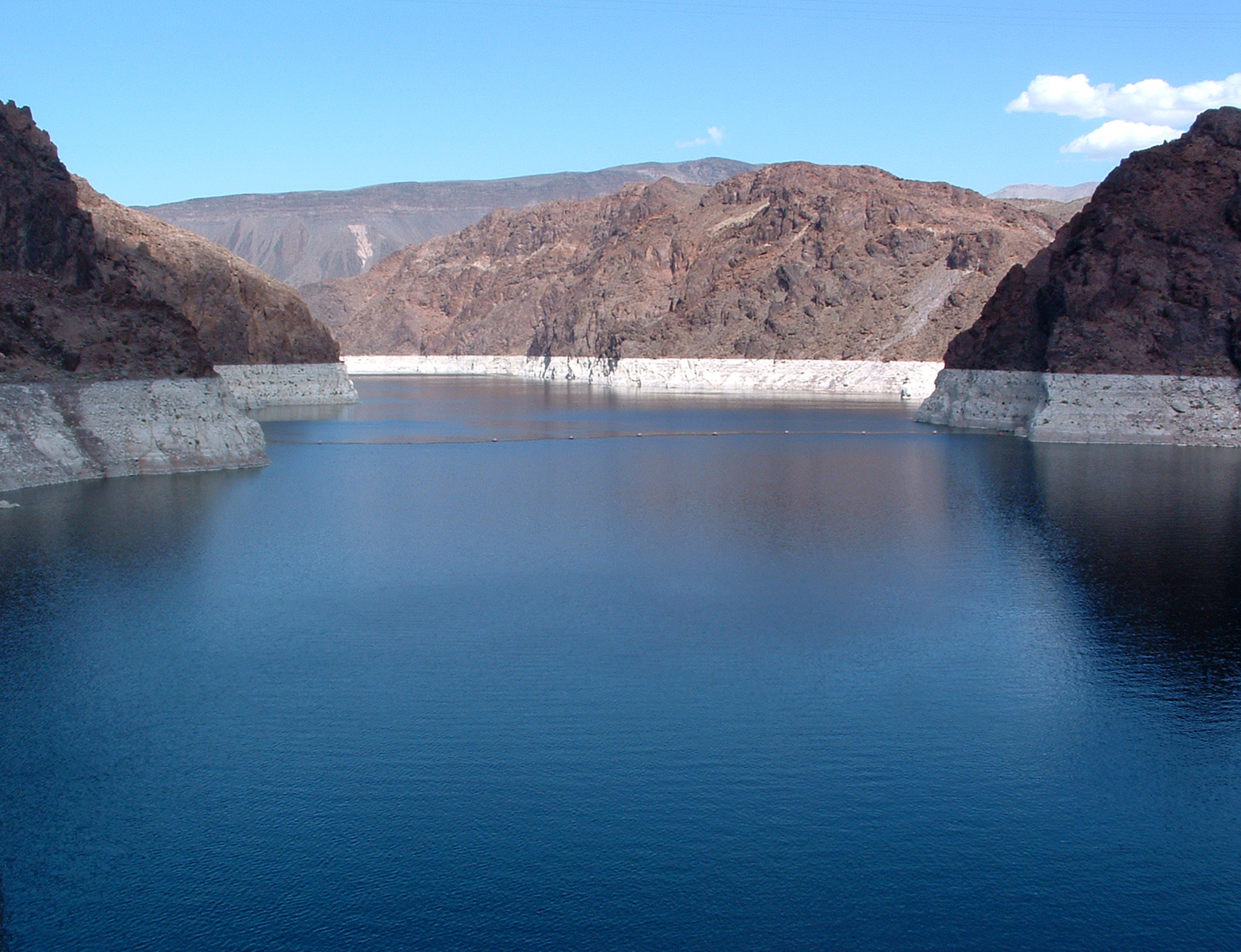
Lake Mead National Recreation Area

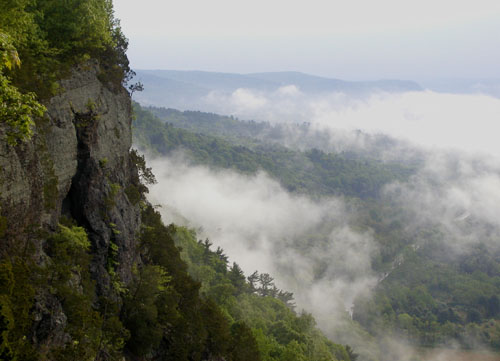
Delaware Water Gap National Recreation Area

There are 18 national recreation areas administered by the National Park Service. Another 22 national recreation areas are administered by the Forest Service and Bureau of Land Management.

Name	Location	Area (2026)
Amistad National Recreation Area	Texas	62,945.15 acres (254.7300 km^{2})
Bighorn Canyon National Recreation Area	Montana, Wyoming	120,296.20 acres (486.8214 km^{2})
Boston Harbor Islands National Recreation Area	Massachusetts	2,230.71 acres (9.0274 km^{2})
Chattahoochee River National Recreation Area	Georgia	12,416.50 acres (50.2478 km^{2})
Chickasaw National Recreation Area	Oklahoma	9,898.63 acres (40.0583 km^{2})
Curecanti National Recreation Area	Colorado	43,590.56 acres (176.4047 km^{2})
Delaware Water Gap National Recreation Area: Middle Delaware National Scenic River	New Jersey, Pennsylvania	68,710.27 acres (278.0606 km^{2})
Gateway National Recreation Area	New York, New Jersey	26,610.45 acres (107.6887 km^{2})
Gauley River National Recreation Area	West Virginia	11,484.40 acres (46.4757 km^{2})
Glen Canyon National Recreation Area	Utah, Arizona	1,254,116.62 acres (5,075.2299 km^{2})
Golden Gate National Recreation Area: Alcatraz Island; Presidio of San Francisco	California	82,347.82 acres (333.2498 km^{2})
Lake Chelan National Recreation Area	Washington	61,939.15 acres (250.6588 km^{2})
Lake Mead National Recreation Area: Grand Canyon–Parashant National Monument	Nevada, Arizona	1,495,855.53 acres (6,053.5126 km^{2})
Lake Meredith National Recreation Area	Texas	44,977.63 acres (182.0180 km^{2})
Lake Roosevelt National Recreation Area	Washington	100,390.31 acres (406.2652 km^{2})
Ross Lake National Recreation Area	Washington	117,574.59 acres (475.8075 km^{2})
Santa Monica Mountains National Recreation Area	California	153,121.09 acres (619.6591 km^{2})
Whiskeytown National Recreation Area	California	42,503.25 acres (172.0046 km^{2})

=== Former or transferred national recreation areas ===
Name	Established	Disbanded	Result
Arbuckle Recreation Area	February 1, 1965	March 17, 1976	Incorporated with Platt National Park and redesignated Chickasaw National Recreation Area
Cuyahoga Valley National Recreation Area	December 27, 1974	October 11, 2000	Redesignated as Cuyahoga Valley National Park
Flaming Gorge National Recreation Area	July 22, 1963	October 1, 1968	Transferred to U.S. Forest Service
Lake Texoma Recreation Area	April 18, 1946	June 30, 1949	Returned to U.S. Army Corps of Engineers
Millerton Lake Recreation Area	May 22, 1945	November 1, 1957	Transferred to state of California; currently operated by the California Department of Water Resources
Shadow Mountain National Recreation Area	June 27, 1952	March 1, 1979	Transferred to U.S. Forest Service
Shasta Lake Recreation Area	May 22, 1945	July 1, 1948	Transferred to U.S. Forest Service

== National seashores ==
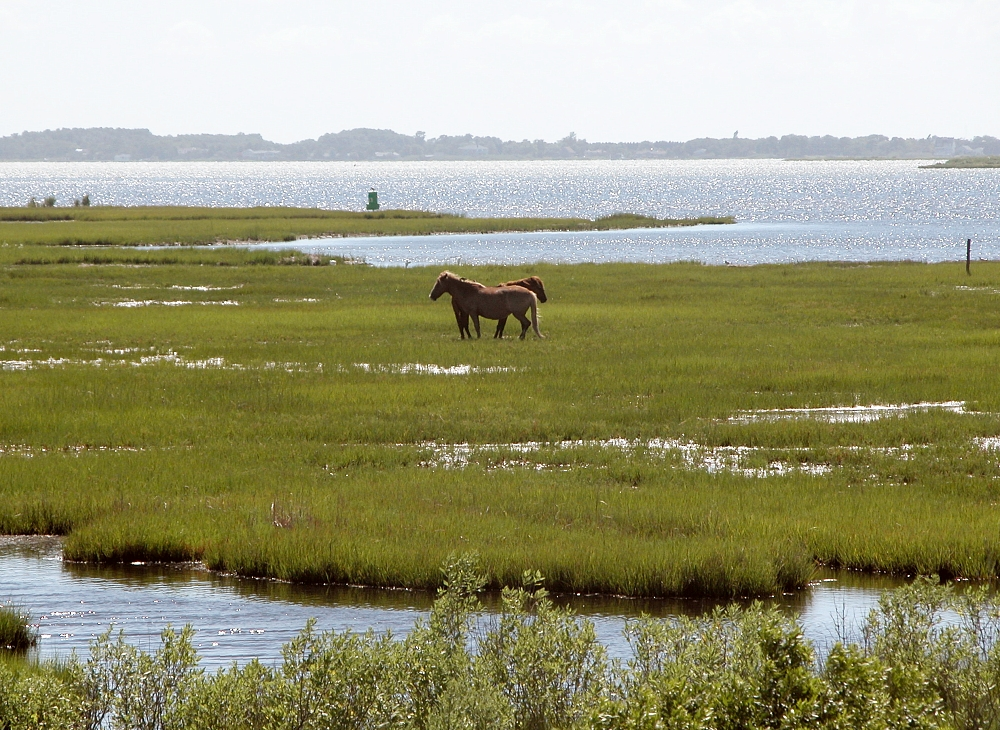
Wild horses on Assateague Island National Seashore

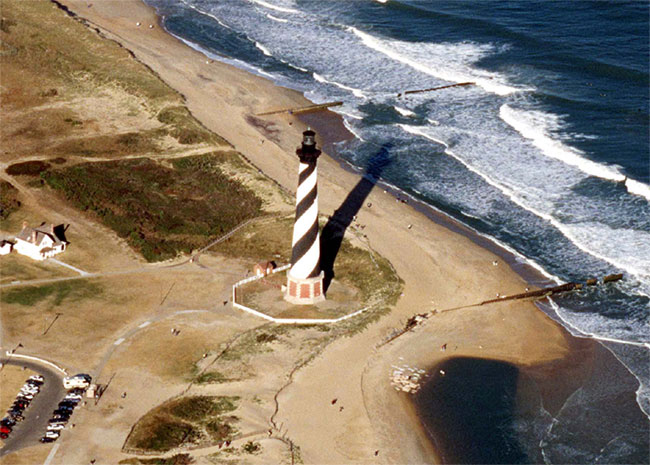
Cape Hatteras National Seashore

There are 10 national seashores.

Name	Location	Area (2026)
Assateague Island National Seashore	Maryland, Virginia	41,311.27 acres (167.1808 km^{2})
Canaveral National Seashore	Florida	57,661.69 acres (233.3486 km^{2})
Cape Cod National Seashore	Massachusetts	43,591.19 acres (176.4073 km^{2})
Cape Hatteras National Seashore	North Carolina	28,385.74 acres (114.8730 km^{2})
Cape Lookout National Seashore	North Carolina	28,243.36 acres (114.2968 km^{2})
Cumberland Island National Seashore	Georgia	36,346.83 acres (147.0904 km^{2})
Fire Island National Seashore	New York	19,580.65 acres (79.2401 km^{2})
Gulf Islands National Seashore	Florida, Mississippi	138,306.64 acres (559.7071 km^{2})
Padre Island National Seashore	Texas	130,434.27 acres (527.8488 km^{2})
Point Reyes National Seashore	California	71,026.44 acres (287.4338 km^{2})

== National lakeshores ==
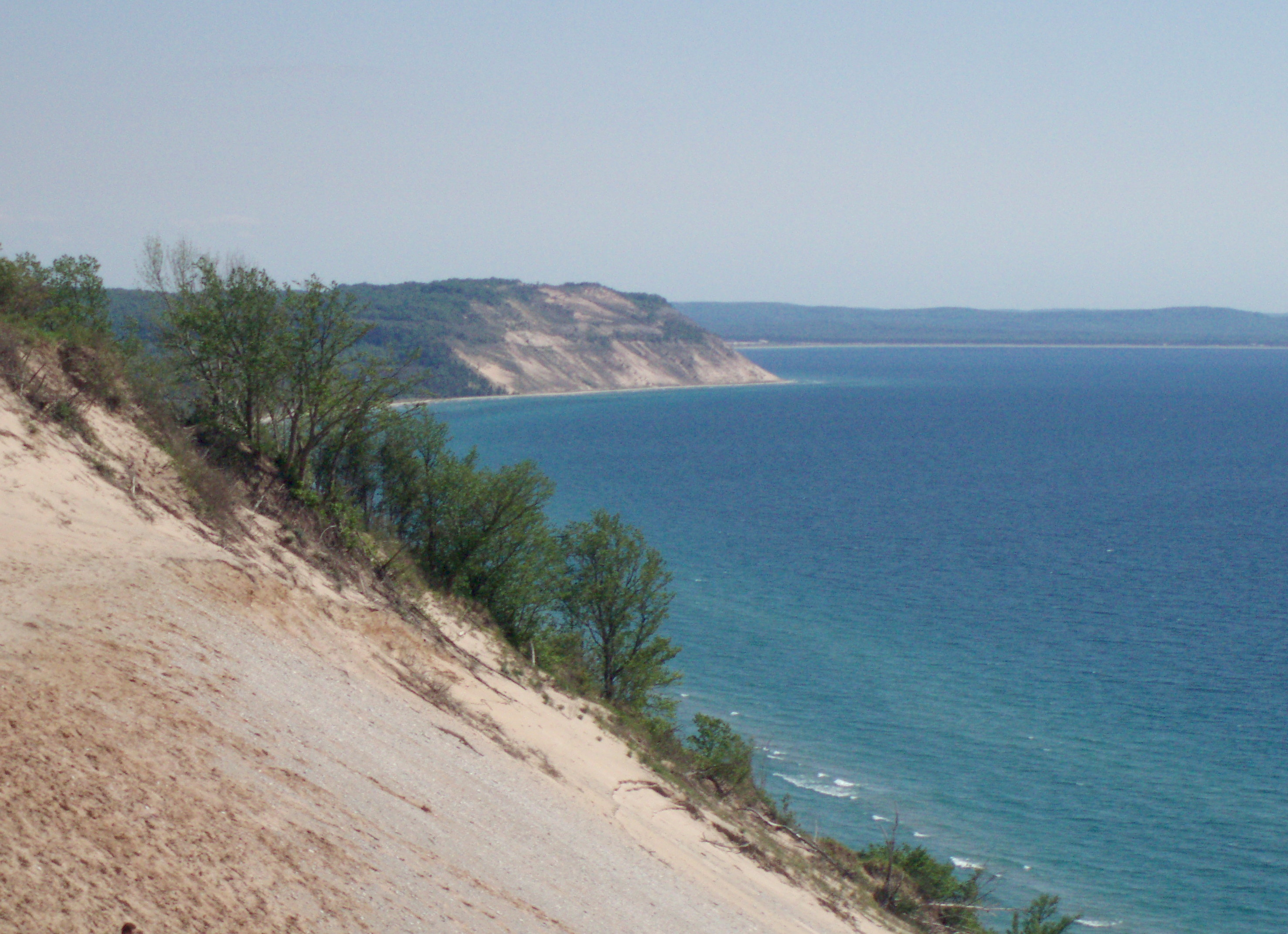
Sleeping Bear Dunes National Lakeshore

There are three national lakeshores, located in Michigan and Wisconsin.

Name	Location	Area (2026)
Apostle Islands National Lakeshore	Wisconsin	69,377.43 acres (280.7605 km^{2})
Pictured Rocks National Lakeshore	Michigan	73,241.34 acres (296.3972 km^{2})
Sleeping Bear Dunes National Lakeshore	Michigan	71,318.57 acres (288.6160 km^{2})

=== Former national lakeshores ===
Name	Established	Disbanded	Result
Indiana Dunes National Lakeshore	November 5, 1966	February 15, 2019	Redesignated Indiana Dunes National Park

== National rivers and national wild and scenic rivers ==
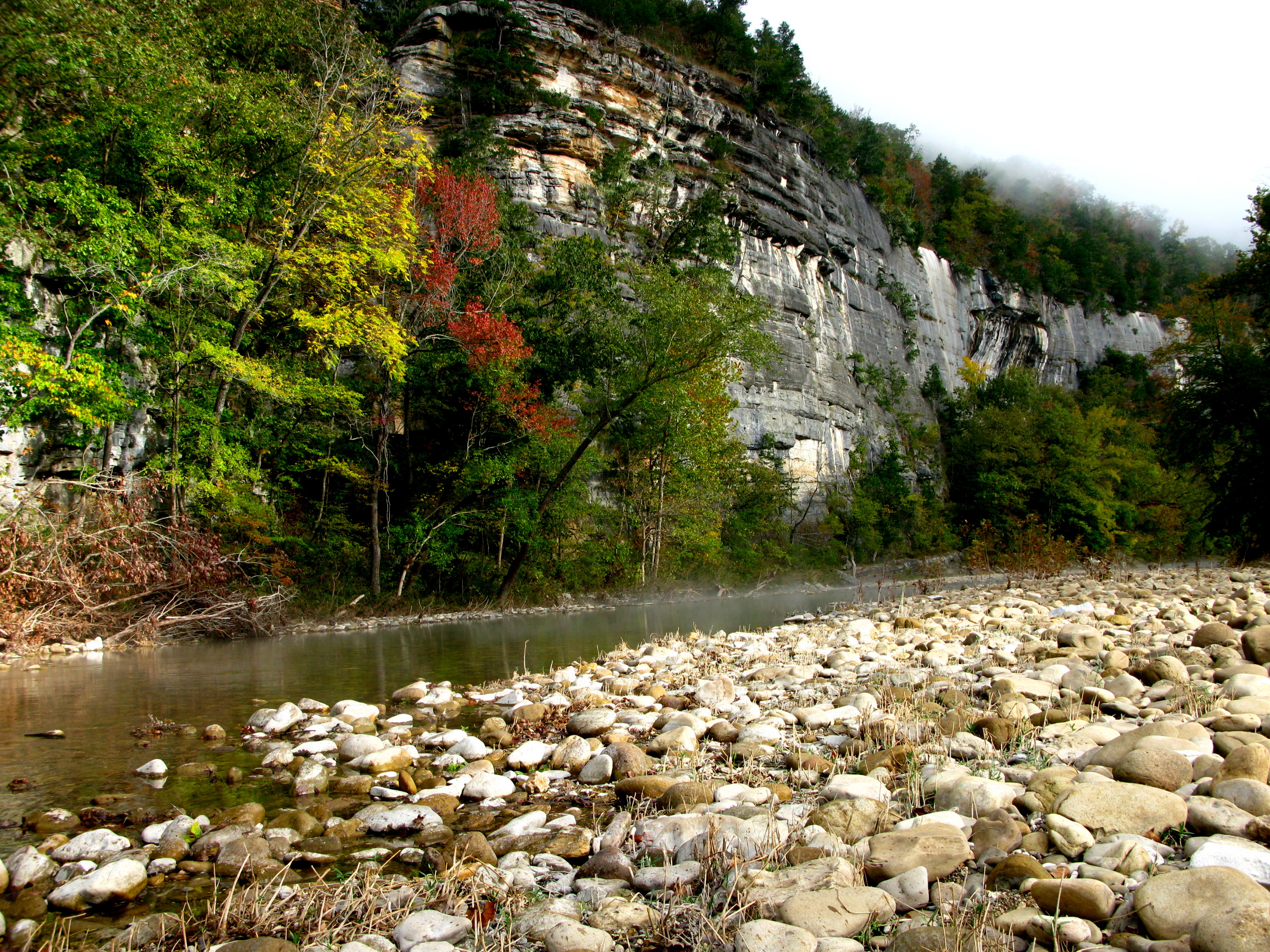
The Buffalo National River, the first National River established in the United States

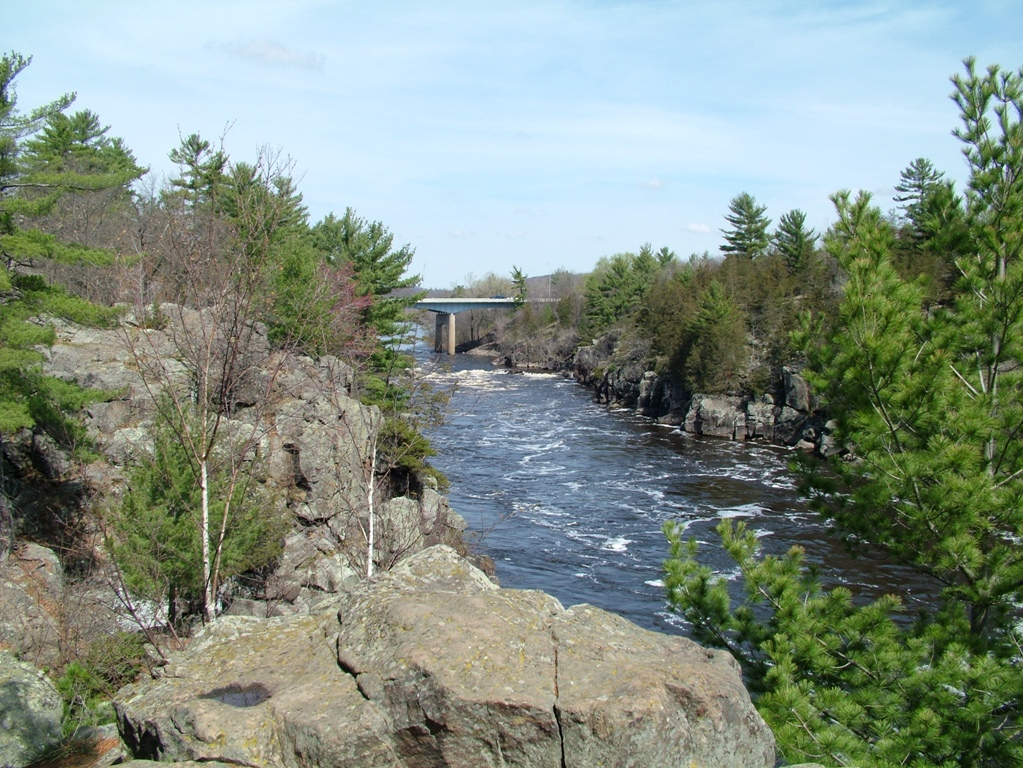
Saint Croix National Scenic Riverway

There are four national rivers (marked with an asterisk) and ten national wild and scenic rivers administered as distinct units of the National Park System. There are many more national wild and scenic rivers that run through other units.

Name	Location	Area (2026)
Alagnak Wild River	Alaska	30,664.79 acres (124.0960 km^{2})
Big South Fork National River and Recreation Area*	Kentucky, Tennessee	123,710.17 acres (500.6373 km^{2})
Bluestone National Scenic River	West Virginia	4,309.51 acres (17.4400 km^{2})
Buffalo National River*	Arkansas	94,301.32 acres (381.6239 km^{2})
Great Egg Harbor National Scenic and Recreational River	New Jersey	43,311.42 acres (175.2751 km^{2})
Middle Delaware National Scenic River	New Jersey, Pennsylvania	1,973.33 acres (7.9858 km^{2})
Mississippi National River and Recreation Area*	Minnesota	53,775.00 acres (217.6197 km^{2})
Missouri National Recreational River	Nebraska, South Dakota	48,456.55 acres (196.0967 km^{2})
Niobrara National Scenic River	Nebraska	29,088.57 acres (117.7173 km^{2})
Obed Wild and Scenic River	Tennessee	5,492.53 acres (22.2275 km^{2})
Ozark National Scenic Riverways*	Missouri	80,784.30 acres (326.9225 km^{2})
Rio Grande Wild and Scenic River	Texas	13,123.39 acres (53.1085 km^{2})
Saint Croix National Scenic Riverway	Wisconsin, Minnesota	68,738.95 acres (278.1767 km^{2})
Upper Delaware Scenic and Recreational River	New York, Pennsylvania	74,999.56 acres (303.5125 km^{2})

=== Former national rivers ===
Name	Established	Disbanded	Result
New River Gorge National River	November 10, 1978	December 27, 2020	Redesignated New River Gorge National Park and Preserve

== National reserves ==
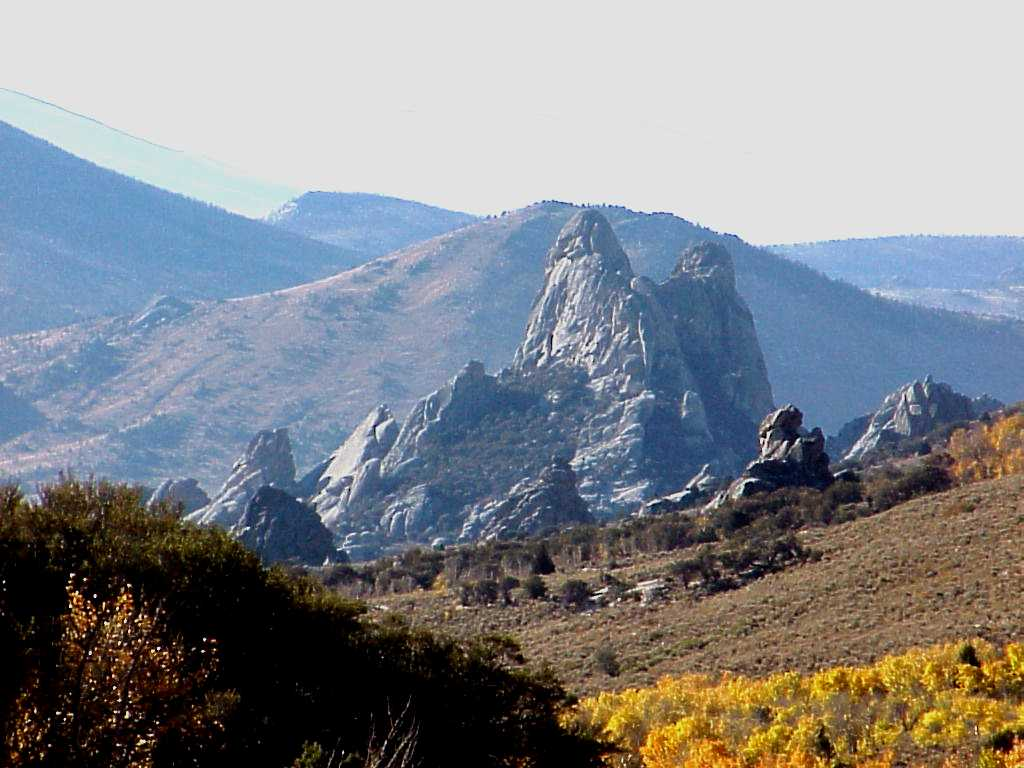
City of Rocks National Reserve in Idaho

National reserves are partnerships between federal, state, and local authorities. Within the boundaries of the three national reserves are combinations of federal land (Park Service or National Wildlife Refuges), state parks and forests, local public lands, and private properties. Two national reserves are currently managed as official units.

Name	Location	Area (2026)
City of Rocks National Reserve	Idaho	14,512.27 acres (58.7291 km^{2})
Ebey's Landing National Historical Reserve	Washington	19,333.51 acres (78.2399 km^{2})
Pinelands National Reserve (affiliated area)	New Jersey	1,164,025 acres (4,710.64 km^{2})

== National parkways ==
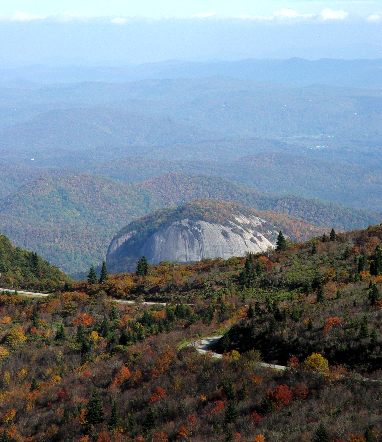
Blue Ridge Parkway in Virginia and North Carolina

Nine roadways and surrounding scenic areas are managed by the NPS as parkways, four of which as official units and five as part of other units.

Name	Location	Area (2026)
Baltimore-Washington Parkway (part of National Capital Parks East)	Maryland, District of Columbia	
Blue Ridge Parkway	Virginia, North Carolina	101,183.59 acres (409.4755 km^{2})
Colonial Parkway (part of Colonial National Historical Park)	Virginia	
Foothills Parkway (part of Great Smoky Mountains National Park)	Tennessee	
George Washington Memorial Parkway (In 1989, the Maryland and DC portions of the parkway were renamed Clara Barton Parkway to overcome motorist confusion).: Clara Barton Parkway; Claude Moore Colonial Farm; Glen Echo Park; Great Falls Park; Theodore Roosevelt Island National Memorial	Virginia, Maryland, District of Columbia	6,721.62 acres (27.2014 km^{2})
John D. Rockefeller, Jr. Memorial Parkway	Wyoming	23,777.22 acres (96.2230 km^{2})
Natchez Trace Parkway	Mississippi, Alabama, Tennessee	52,380.46 acres (211.9762 km^{2})
Rock Creek and Potomac Parkway (part of Rock Creek Park)	District of Columbia	
Suitland Parkway (part of National Capital Parks East)	Maryland	

== National historic and scenic trails ==
These National Park Service trails are part of the larger National Trails System. Only six of the trails are considered official units of the park system.

Name	Location	Area (2026)
Ala Kahakai National Historic Trail	Hawaii	
Appalachian Trail (official unit)	Maine - Georgia	246,925.75 acres (999.2731 km^{2})
Butterfield Overland National Historic Trail	Tennessee and Missouri - California	
California National Historic Trail	Missouri - California	
Captain John Smith Chesapeake National Historic Trail	Delaware - District of Columbia - Maryland - Virginia	
Chilkoot National Historic Trail	Alaska - British Columbia	
El Camino Real de los Tejas National Historic Trail	Louisiana - Texas	
El Camino Real de Tierra Adentro National Historic Trail	New Mexico	
Ice Age National Scenic Trail (official unit)	Wisconsin	235.16 acres (0.9517 km^{2})
Juan Bautista de Anza National Historic Trail	Arizona - California	
Lewis and Clark National Historic Trail	Illinois - Oregon	
Mormon Pioneer National Historic Trail	Illinois - Utah	
Natchez Trace Trail (official unit)	Mississippi - Tennessee	10,995.00 acres (44.4952 km^{2})
New England National Scenic Trail (official unit)	Connecticut - Massachusetts	196.04 acres (0.7933 km^{2})
North Country National Scenic Trail (official unit)	Vermont - North Dakota	813.41 acres (3.2918 km^{2})
Old Spanish National Historic Trail	New Mexico - California	
Oregon National Historic Trail	Missouri - Oregon	
Overmountain Victory National Historic Trail	Virginia - Tennessee - North Carolina - South Carolina	
Pony Express National Historic Trail	Missouri - California	
Potomac Heritage National Scenic Trail (official unit)	Virginia - Maryland - Pennsylvania - District of Columbia	0.00 acres (0 km^{2})
Santa Fe National Historic Trail	Missouri - New Mexico	
Selma to Montgomery National Historic Trail	Alabama	
Star-Spangled Banner National Historic Trail	District of Columbia - Maryland - Virginia	
Trail of Tears National Historic Trail	Tennessee - Oklahoma	
Washington-Rochambeau National Historic Trail	Massachusetts - Virginia	

== National cemeteries ==
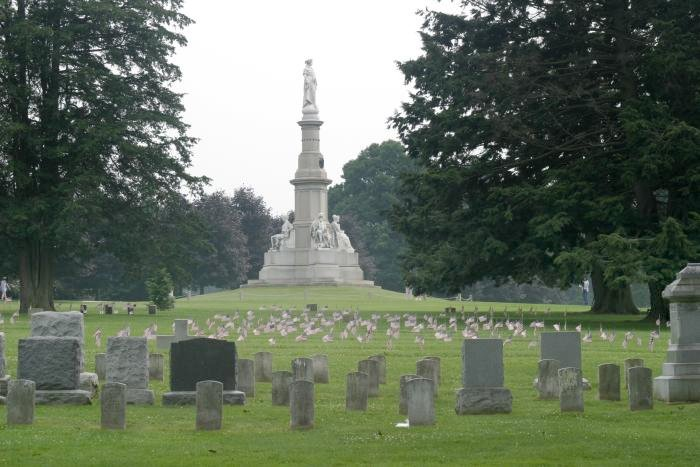
Gettysburg National Cemetery

Most national cemeteries are administered by the Department of Veterans Affairs, although a few are managed by the National Park Service and the U.S. Army. None of the cemeteries are considered official units of the system; they are all affiliated with other parks.

Name	Location
Andersonville National Cemetery	Georgia
Andrew Johnson National Cemetery	Tennessee
Antietam National Cemetery	Maryland
Battleground National Cemetery	District of Columbia
Chalmette National Cemetery	Louisiana
Custer National Cemetery	Montana
Fort Donelson National Cemetery	Tennessee
Fredericksburg National Cemetery	Virginia
Gettysburg National Cemetery	Pennsylvania
Poplar Grove National Cemetery	Virginia
Shiloh National Cemetery	Tennessee
Stones River National Cemetery	Tennessee
Vicksburg National Cemetery	Mississippi
Yorktown National Cemetery	Virginia

=== Transferred national cemeteries ===
Name	Established	Disbanded	Result
Chattanooga National Cemetery	August 10, 1933	December 7, 1944	returned to War Department

== National heritage areas ==
The National Park Service provides limited assistance to national heritage areas, but does not administer them.

== Other NPS protected areas and administrative groups ==
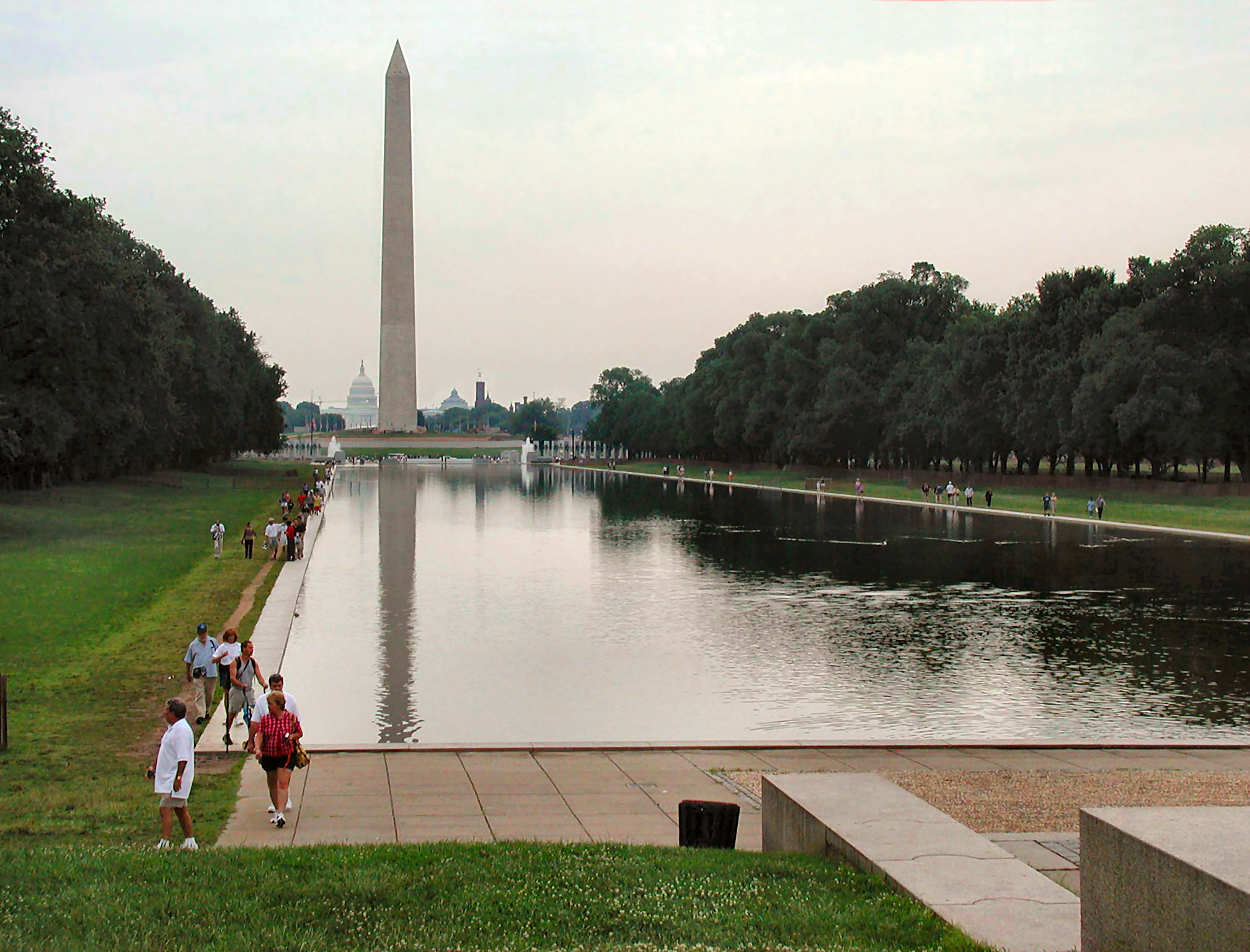
National Mall

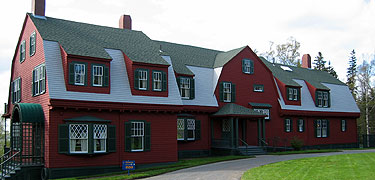
Roosevelt Campobello International Park (affiliated area)

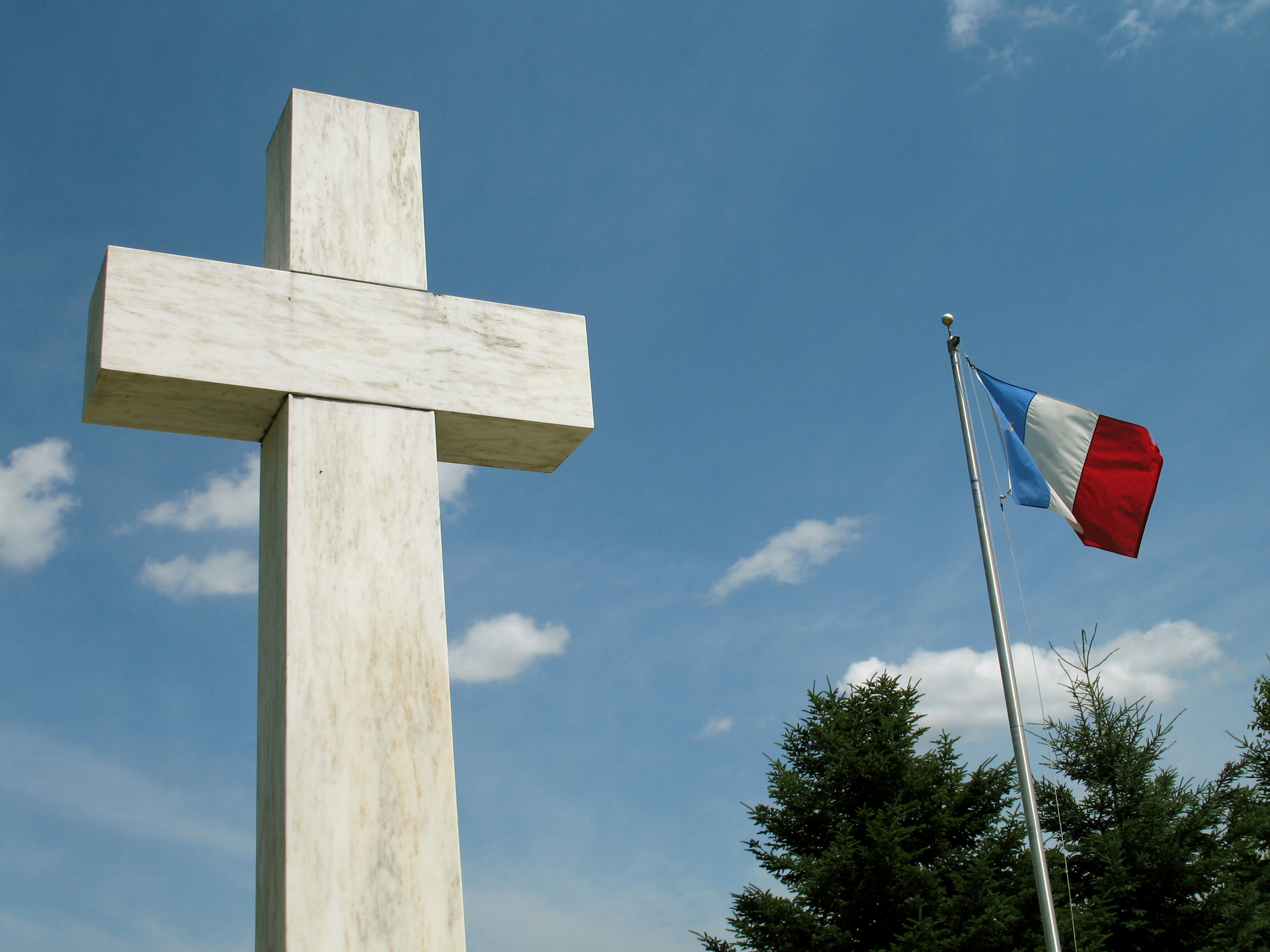
Acadian Landing Site at Maine Acadian Culture (affiliated area)

There are 11 NPS units of other designations, as well as other affiliated areas. The National Mall and National Capital Parks have many sites, some of which are also units of other designations.

Name	Location	Area (2026)
Aleutian World War II National Historic Area (affiliated area)	Alaska	134.94 acres (0.5461 km^{2})
Catoctin Mountain Park	Maryland	5,890.92 acres (23.8397 km^{2})
Claymont High School (affiliated area of Brown v. Board of Education National Historical Park)	Delaware	
Constitution Gardens	District of Columbia	39.23 acres (0.1588 km^{2})
Eutaw Springs Battlefield (affiliated area)	South Carolina	
Fort Washington Park	Maryland	345.05 acres (1.3964 km^{2})
General George C. Marshall House (affiliated area)	Virginia	
Greenbelt Park	Maryland	1,175.98 acres (4.7590 km^{2})
Historic Camden Revolutionary War Site (affiliated area)	South Carolina	107.00 acres (0.4330 km^{2})
Hockessin Colored School #107 (affiliated area of Brown v. Board of Education National Historical Park)	Delaware	
Howard High School (affiliated area of Brown v. Board of Education National Historical Park)	Delaware	
Ice Age National Scientific Reserve (affiliated area)	Wisconsin	32,500.00 acres (131.5228 km^{2})
International Peace Garden (affiliated area)	North Dakota/Manitoba	2,330.30 acres (9.4304 km^{2})
Inupiat Heritage Center (affiliated area)	Alaska	0.00 acres (0 km^{2})
John Philip Sousa Junior High School (affiliated area of Brown v. Board of Education National Historical Park)	District of Columbia	
Kettle Creek Battlefield (affiliated area)	Georgia	
Maine Acadian Culture (affiliated area)	Maine	
National Capital Parks-East: Anacostia Park; Baltimore-Washington Parkway; Capitol Hill Parks; Carter G. Woodson Home National Historic Site (also an official unit); Fort Dupont Park; Fort Foote Park; Fort Washington Park (also an official unit); Frederick Douglass National Historic Site (also an official unit); Greenbelt Park (also an official unit); Harmony Hall (Fort Washington, Maryland); Kenilworth Park and Aquatic Gardens; Mary McLeod Bethune Council House National Historic Site (also an official unit); Oxon Cove Park and Oxon Hill Farm; Oxon Run Parkway; Piscataway Park (also an official unit); Suitland Parkway	District of Columbia/Maryland	7,010.80 acres (28.3717 km^{2})(excludes those counted in other units)
National Mall and Memorial Parks (formerly National Capital Parks-Central): African American Civil War Memorial; American Veterans Disabled for Life Memorial; Belmont-Paul Women's Equality National Monument (also an official unit); Constitution Gardens (also an official unit); District of Columbia War Memorial; East Potomac Park; Ford's Theatre National Historic Site (also an official unit); Franklin Delano Roosevelt Memorial (also an official unit); George Mason Memorial; Jefferson Memorial (also an official unit); John Ericsson National Memorial; Korean War Veterans Memorial (also an official unit); Lincoln Memorial (also an official unit); National Mall; Pennsylvania Avenue National Historic Site (also an official unit); Old Post Office Pavilion; Ukraine Independence Park (Taras Shevchenko Memorial); United States Navy Memorial (part of Pennsylvania Avenue National Historic Site); Vietnam Veterans Memorial (also an official unit); Washington Monument (also an official unit); West Potomac Park; World War I Memorial (also an official unit); World War II Memorial (also an official unit)	District of Columbia	167.21 acres (0.6767 km^{2})(National Mall only)
Parker's Crossroads Battlefield (affiliated area)	Tennessee	
Piscataway Park	Maryland	4,620.06 acres (18.6967 km^{2})
Prince William Forest Park	Virginia	16,062.92 acres (65.0043 km^{2})
Robert Russa Moton School (affiliated area of Brown v. Board of Education National Historical Park)	Virginia	
Rock Creek Park: Dumbarton Oaks Park; Battleground National Cemetery; Meridian Hill Park; Old Stone House; Peirce Mill (part of Rock Creek Park); Rock Creek and Potomac Parkway	District of Columbia	1,754.70 acres (7.1010 km^{2})
Roosevelt Campobello International Park (affiliated area)	New Brunswick	2,721.50 acres (11.0135 km^{2})
White House/President's Park	District of Columbia	18.07 acres (0.0731 km^{2})
Wing Luke Museum of the Asian Pacific American Experience (affiliated area)	Washington	0.00 acres (0 km^{2})
Wolf Trap National Park for the Performing Arts	Virginia	130.28 acres (0.5272 km^{2})

In addition, there are sites where the NPS is authorized to provide financial and technical assistance to local authorities for interpretive or educational purposes, but do not have the right to acquire land or have a say in land use or zoning. These include the 55 National Heritage Areas, as well as National Commemorative Sites such as Quindaro Townsite or the Kennedy-King National Commemorative Site. There are also various administrative groups of listed parks, such as Manhattan Sites, National Parks of New York Harbor, and Western Arctic National Parklands. The NPS also owns conservation easements (but not the land itself) for part of the area called the Green Springs National Historic Landmark District.

=== Former other areas ===
Name	Established	Disbanded	Result
Appomattox Court House National Historical Monument	1935	1954	Redesignated Appomattox Court House National Historical Park; previously Appomattox National Battlefield Site (1930–1935)
National Visitor Center, Washington, D.C.	March 12, 1968	December 29, 1981	Transferred to Department of Transportation
John F. Kennedy Center for the Performing Arts	June 16, 1972	July 21, 1994	Transferred to Kennedy Center Trustees
New Jersey Coastal Heritage Trail Route (affiliated area)	1988	September 30, 2011	Multiple site agencies continue managing the route without NPS partnership

In the 1930s and 1940s, the NPS developed dozens of recreational demonstration areas, most of which eventually became national or state parks.

== See also ==
- List of the United States National Park System official units (the 434)
- List of fee areas in the United States National Park System
- List of all national parks of the world
- List of U.S. state parks
- National Park Passport Stamps
- List of National Natural Landmarks
- List of tourist attractions worldwide
