= Saint John's Catholic Prep (Maryland) =

American college preparatory school founded 1829

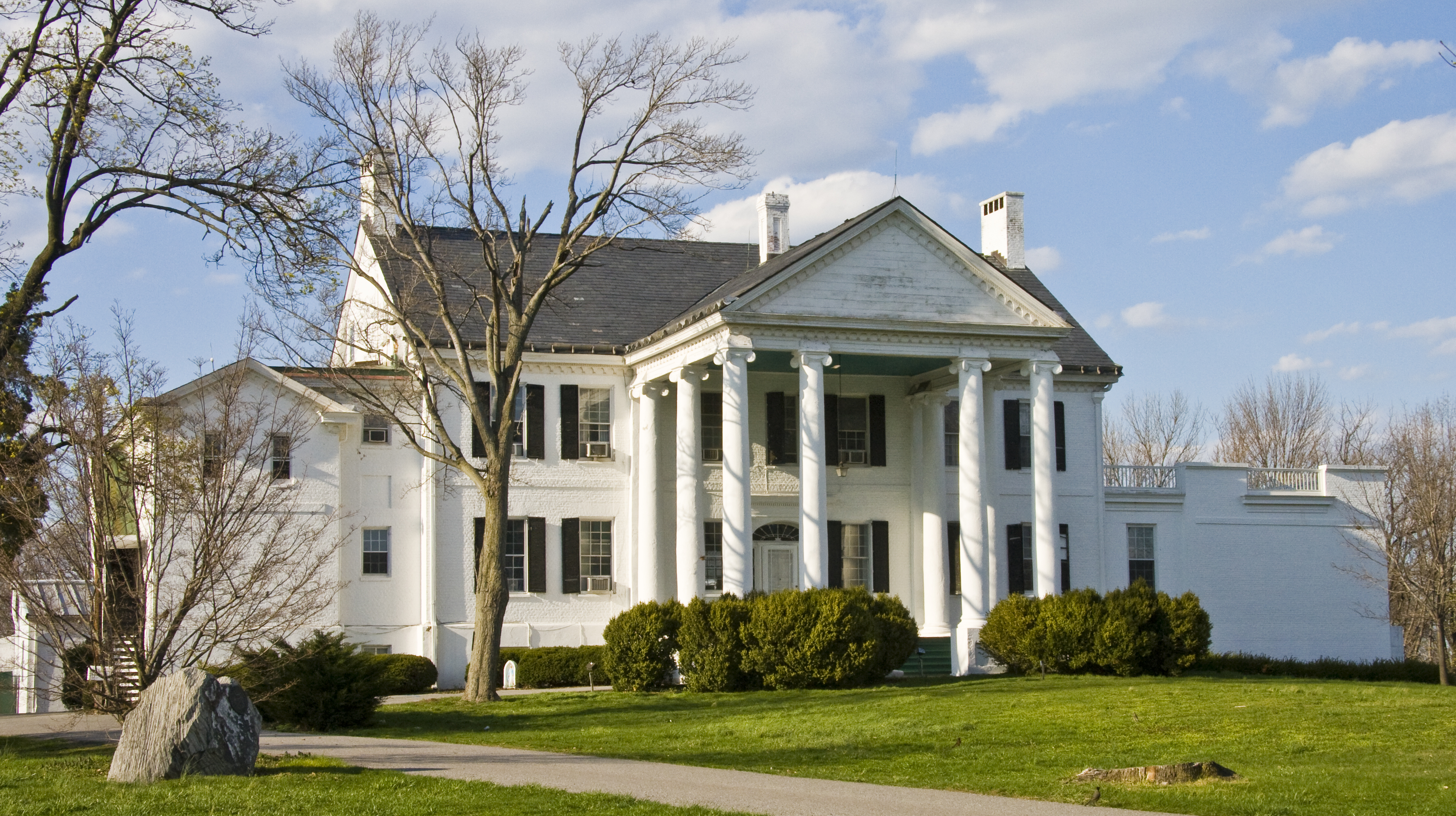
- Old Prospect Hall Campus

Location
- 3989 Buckeystown Pike; Buckeystown, (Frederick County), Maryland 21717; United States
- 39°20′28″N 77°25′38″W

Information
- Former name: St. John's Literary Institution
- Type: Private, Day, College Preparatory
- Religious affiliation: Roman Catholic
- Established: 1829; 197 years ago
- Founder: John McElroy (1782–1877)
- Head of school: Will Knotek
- Teaching staff: 28.4 (on an FTE basis)
- Grades: 9–12
- Gender: Coeducational
- Student to teacher ratio: 10.6
- Colors: Green and Gold
- Athletics conference: M.I.A.A./I.A.A.M.
- Mascot: Viking
- Website: www.saintjohnsprep.org

Saint John's Catholic Prep (formerly known as St. John's Literary Institution) is a private, Roman Catholic, coeducational, college preparatory high school in Buckeystown, Maryland, located just southwest of Frederick City. At the time of its founding in 1829, it was located on Second Street in eastern downtown Frederick. Beginning in 1958 and for 45 years thereafter, the school was housed in the historic "Prospect Hall" mansion, (1787–1803), also just southwest of Frederick. St. John's was the first independent Roman Catholic school in the state of Maryland. It was also the first Roman Catholic secondary school in the state of Maryland.

== Background ==
In 1756, a small Roman Catholic boys' school was opened in Frederick, Maryland, which provided a space for class and mass to be held. The population of Frederick was expanding, and in 1763 the first Roman Catholic Church (under the Archdiocese of Baltimore) St. John's Frederick-Town Church, was constructed by Father John Williams, the first priest and pastor in Frederick. This new structure would house classes for 66 years.

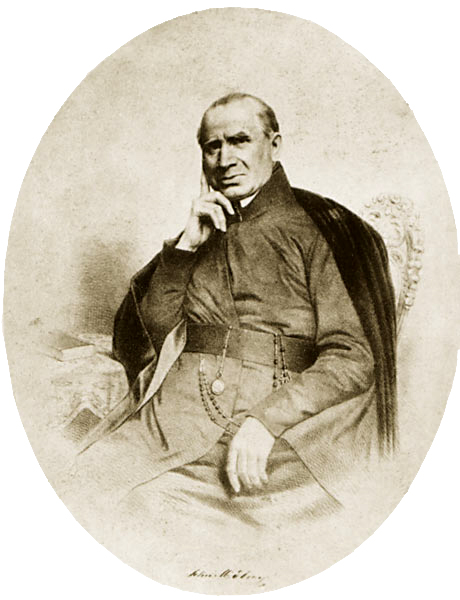
John McElroy, SJ (1782–1877)

In 1822, a Jesuit priest, Father John McElroy, (1782–1877), was appointed to the pastorate at "St. John's Frederick-Town Church" in Frederick. His first major action was to work with the religious order Sisters of Charity in nearby Emmitsburg, Maryland to help five sisters opening the "St. John's Female Benevolent and Frederick Free School" in Frederick, in January 1824.

With the educational needs of Frederick's girls gradually being met, McElroy's next task was to found an educational institution for boys in the town. In 1822, subscriptions were being taken and construction of the boys school had begun on East Second Street (in the eastern section of downtown Frederick) by August 7, 1828. It was completed the following year, and opened in 1829 as "St. John's Literary Institution". Occasionally known thereafter as "St. John's College", the school was an academic rival to Georgetown College, founded earlier in (1829) near Washington, D.C. by the first American Bishop John Carroll, the Archbishop of Baltimore. After several years of running St. John's in Frederick, Fr. McElroy was transferred to Boston in 1847; there he would use the skills he acquired in Frederick to establish the nationally known Boston College, and its preparatory institution, Boston College High School along with the Church of the Immaculate Conception, all "Jesuit" institutions.

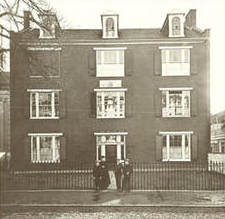
Original location of The St. John's Literary Institution on East Second Street in Frederick, Maryland, founded 1829

The Jesuits left Frederick in 1903, and transferred control of the St. John's Literary Institution and the parish of St John the Evangelist Roman Catholic Church to diocesan priests from Baltimore, Maryland. In 1915, Father William Kane, the first diocesan pastor of St. John's the Evangelist of Frederick, arranged for the educationally focused women's religious order, the School Sisters of Notre Dame to help staff the school. He also combined classes from the girls' Visitation Academy and the boys from St. John's to create the first co-ed school under the name of St. John's L.I.

St. John's then began allowing girls to enroll for classes in 1925. With attendance expanding, the original school structure built on Second Street by founder Father John McElroy in 1828 was demolished and a new building was erected in its place in the eastern sections of downtown Frederick.

In 1958, the School separated and the high school of grades 9 to 12 moved from the East Second Street location, which would continue to house what was to be called "St. John's Elementary School" to the newly purchased Prospect Hall, a large mansion constructed on old "Red Hill" southwest of town off of Jefferson Pike and the new Butterfly Lane, built 1787-1803 and most recently owned by a former U.S. Representative (Congressman) Joseph H. Himes, (also source for the renamed nearby road segment and postal address of Himes Avenue). An additional temporary building was constructed at the rear of the mansion providing additional classrooms, an auditorium and gymnasium.

At about this time the school was colloquially renamed "St. John's at Prospect Hall"—a name which was used almost as often as its traditional name, St. John's Literary Institution.

The School Sisters of Notre Dame withdrew from staffing and leading St John's in 1972, and under the pressure and possibility of closure, a group of parents, alumni, faculty and parishioners pooled their energies and resources to recharter St. John's as the first independent Roman Catholic School in Maryland, with a Board of Trustees. During the early 21st century, the school's Physical Education Department and interscholastic athletics programs became known statewide for their athletic success, especially in basketball, winning several state titles and scoring high on the local newspapers' lists of top high school teams. By 2005, having outgrown the facilities at Prospect Hall, St. John's acquired 46 acres of land in nearby Buckeystown, Maryland (further southwest of Frederick along the Buckeystown Pike), adjacent to the property of St. Thomas More Academy (Buckeystown, Maryland). Embarking upon its new goal of moving from the historic "Prospect Hall" mansion property, by whose name it had been known by for almost 45 years, the School began a "re-branding" campaign and changed its title to "Saint John's Catholic Prep".

St. Thomas More Academy property located in Buckeystown, Maryland

On Monday, December 5, 2011, Saint John's agreed to buy the former St. Thomas More Academy property in Buckeystown for an undisclosed amount. The property was assessed by the state Maryland Department of Assessments and Taxation on January 1, 2010, and was valued at $5,424,400.

With its holdings now encompassing the original St. Thomas More buildings, and with the construction of more classrooms and sports fields, Saint John's Catholic Prep moved from Prospect Hall to the Buckeystown campus in January 2013. Classes there officially began January 14, 2013, with the school ready to continue its 184-year-old tradition of academic excellence in western Maryland.

== Academics ==
In addition to standard and honors high school level courses, Saint John's Catholic Prep also offers Advanced Placement (AP) courses and dual-credit courses with Frederick Community College, both of which are taught at a college level. St. John's offers many AP classes in language, math, science, history, and even art.

== Athletics ==
All boys' sports participate in the Maryland Interscholastic Athletic Association (MIAA), while the girls' sports participate in the Interscholastic Athletic Association of Maryland (IAAM), both established in 1993 as the private schools' successors to the previous Maryland Scholastic Association (M.S.A.), founded 1919, as a private-public schools league. The following sports are offered:

Boys	Girls
Baseball	Softball
Basketball	Basketball
Cross-Country	Cross-Country
Football	Cheerleading
Lacrosse	Lacrosse
Soccer	Soccer
Tennis	Tennis
Track & Field-Indoor & Outdoor	Track & Field-Indoor & Outdoor
Golf	Volleyball

== Notable alumni ==
- Samuel Mudd (1833 - 1883), an American physician imprisoned for alleged conspiracy providing aid to John Wilkes Booth, the assassin of President Abraham Lincoln. Dr. Mudd during his imprisonment at Fort Jefferson, Florida single-handedly created a method for treating the Yellow Fever epidemic at the fort in 1868. Due to his efforts, a petition was submitted and pardon was granted by President Andrew Johnson for his heroic lifesaving work.
- Bernard A. Maguire (1818–1886), American Jesuit and president of Georgetown University
- Enoch Louis Lowe (1820–1892), 29th Governor of Maryland, served 1851–1854.
- Winfield Scott Schley (1839–1911), rear admiral in the United States Navy, participated in the Spanish–American War of 1898.
- Nate James, 2001 NCAA Basketball champion with the Duke Blue Devils.
- Nikki Teasley (b. 1979), basketball player in the WNBA.
- Ego Ferguson, NFL player for the Chicago Bears.
- Cheikh Yaya Dia, professional basketball player
- Jason Capel, McDonalds All American 1998 All ACC 2001 & 2002 UNC Chapel Hill professional basketball player Gatorade Player of the year

== See also ==
- National Catholic Educational Association
