= Jean Payen de Boisneuf =

French politician and planter

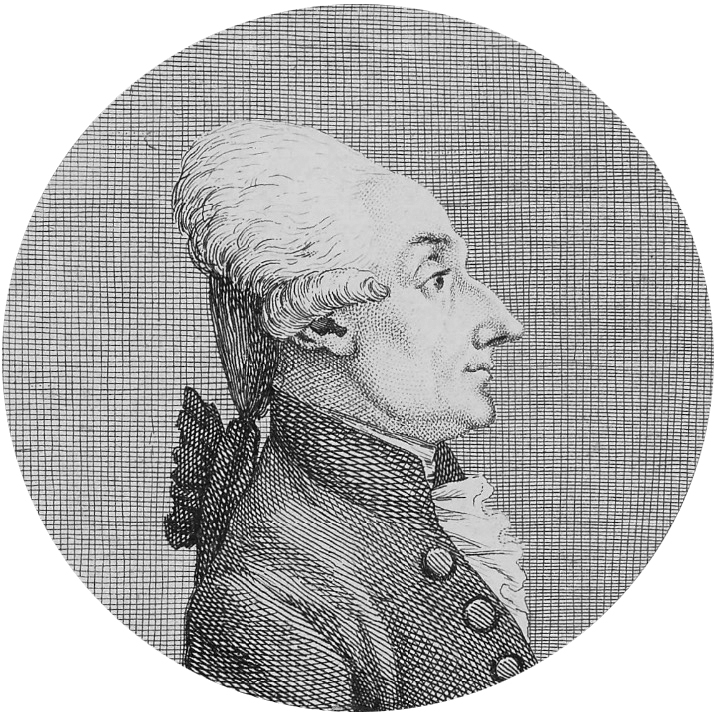
- Portrait by Olivier Perrin.
- Born: 25 February 1738; Les Verrettes (Saint-Domingue)
- Died: 1 July 1815 (aged 77); United States
- Occupations: Military officer, politician, plantation owner

Jean Payen de Boisneuf (1738-1815), was a French military officer and plantation owner, who had estates in Saint-Domingue (now Haiti) and in Touraine. He was elected deputy of the bailiwick of Touraine for the Estates General of 1789. As a member of a family of plantation owners, he was a pro-slavery activist and a member of the Feuillants. In 1791 he came to the United States and met with Thomas Jefferson seeking American intervention in the Haitian Revolution, which was refused. He returned to the United States in 1793, settling with distant relatives in Maryland, where they attempted to re-create a plantation similar to that with which they were familiar in Saint-Domingue. L'Hermitage Plantation was notable for its large-scale enslavement and for mistreatment of the slaves.

== Biography ==
=== Birth and family ===
Jean Payen de Boisneuf was born on February 25, 1738, in Les Verettes (now Verettes), Saint-Domingue. His father, from a family of traders, was a knight of the Order of Saint Louis and commander of the militias of the Verrettes parish. His mother was born Marie-Claudine Lezlee, Lezelé, or Leslay. A brother was named Pierre.

=== Officer in Saint-Domingue and return to France ===
On January 31, 1757, Jean Payen de Boisneuf was 19 years old when he entered the service of the king as an ensign in the militia commanded by his father. In 1767, he was appointed commander of troops detached to intervene against English privateers who raided the island. He succeeded in effectively countering this enemy, capturing some, and taking them to the prisons of the city of Saint-Marc. In 1765 he obtained a commission as captain of a company of hussars in the Saint-Marc district and in 1771, after a trip to France on business, he obtained the same position for an infantry company. In 1776, he was appointed assistant captain of the Mont-Louis district, in charge of the district's police. In 1777, exhausted and in poor health, he returned to France while his superiors requested that he be decorated with the cross of St Louis, as a retirement and reward for his services.

The Payen family owned several large plantations in Saint-Domingue, producing coffee and sugar. Payen de Boisneuf's brother Pierre was the proprietor of the plantations.

=== Deputy of the Estates-General and the Constituent Assembly ===
Jean Payen de Boisneuf was elected, on March 24, 1789, deputy of the Third Estate at the Estates-General by the bailiwick of Touraine, with 99 votes out of a total of 162 voters. The intendant gave him the description of "Very rich American" in his report.

He was present at the Tennis Court Oath, then became a member of the colonial committee. On April 26, 1790, he was one of the new members of the Committee of General Security.

A member of the Feuillants, he was a close friend of Médéric Louis Élie Moreau de Saint-Méry, like him, he defended slavery, notably on April 28, 1791, he intervened to highlight the negative impact caused by the declaration of the rights of man on the colonists of Saint-Domingue "the members of the colonial assembly were misled by the fear of a rigorous application of this declaration in a country where existence is inconceivable with the first article."

He attended the installation of the constitutional bishop of Paris, Jean-Baptiste Gobel, on March 26, 1791. His last involvement in metropolitan France was to be appointed second high juror of Indre-et-Loire, on September 3, 1791.

Jean's brother Pierre Payen died in 1791, the year of the Haitian Revolution.

=== Emigration to the United States ===
After refusing to be elected to the mayoralty of Tours, Payen de Boisneuf sold his property in Touraine to his brother-in-law. Rather than return to Saint-Domingue following the death of his brother, Payen de Boisneuf came to the United States in 1791 with the Baron de Beauvais to solicit help from the United States in putting down the Haitian Revolution. The pair traveled to Philadelphia with the aim of delivering the request to George Washington. They met with Thomas Jefferson, who passed their letter on to Congress, but no action was taken. Payen de Boisneuf returned to France, but returned to the United States in 1793, intending to go on to Saint-Domingue. Deciding neither to go to Saint-Domingue during a civil war or to go back to Paris during the Reign of Terror, Payen de Boisneuf instead went to live with his cousin's wife's family, the Vincendrieres. The Vincendriere family owned substantial plantations at l'Hermitage, near Frederick, Maryland.

== L'Hermitage Plantation ==
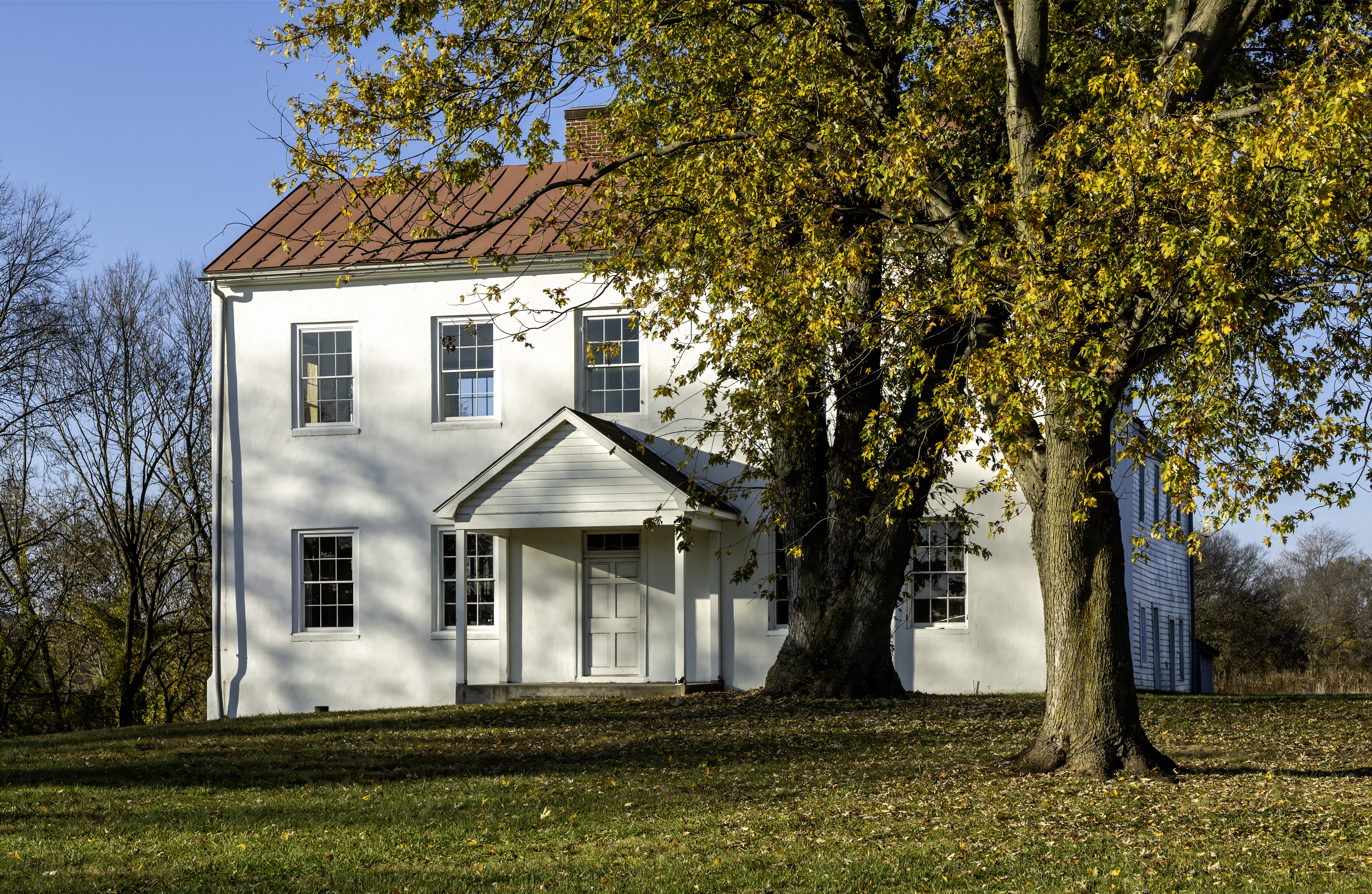
L’Hermitage

The l'Hermitage plantation was unusual for its area, having a population of about 90 enslaved people. Crops in Central Maryland did not require so much labor to work them, and comparable properties using slaves generally had a much smaller workforce. L'Hermitage's labor force was similar to that found in Saint-Domingue, where coffee and sugar cane crops were more labor-intensive than in Maryland, where grains were grown.

L'Hermitage acquired a reputation for harsh treatment of those it enslaved. Julian Ursyn Niemcewicz traveled through the area in June 1798, writing:

Four miles from [Frederick] we forded the [Monocacy] river. On its banks one can see a row of wooden houses and one stone house with the upper storeys painted white. This is the residence of a Frenchman called Payant, who left San Domingo with a substantial sum and with it bought two nor three thousand acres of land and a few hundred Negroes whom he treats with the greatest tyranny. One can see on the farm instruments of torture, stocks, wooden horses, whips, etc. Two or three negroes crippled with torture have brought legal action against him ... The man is 60 years old, without children or relatives... In this way does this man use his wealth and comforts his life in its descent toward the grave.

Nine cases were brought against Payen de Boisneuf for cruelty to slaves in Frederick County. Most of these brought no adjudication.

While some prejudice against the French Catholic Payen de Boisneuf and Vincendrieres may be assumed from the largely German Protestant population of the area, and was reflected in the somewhat exaggerated account related by Niemcewicz's German-American driver to Niemcewicz, Payen de Boisneuf appears to have been unpopular in Maryland for a series of unpaid debts and for his treatment of slaves.

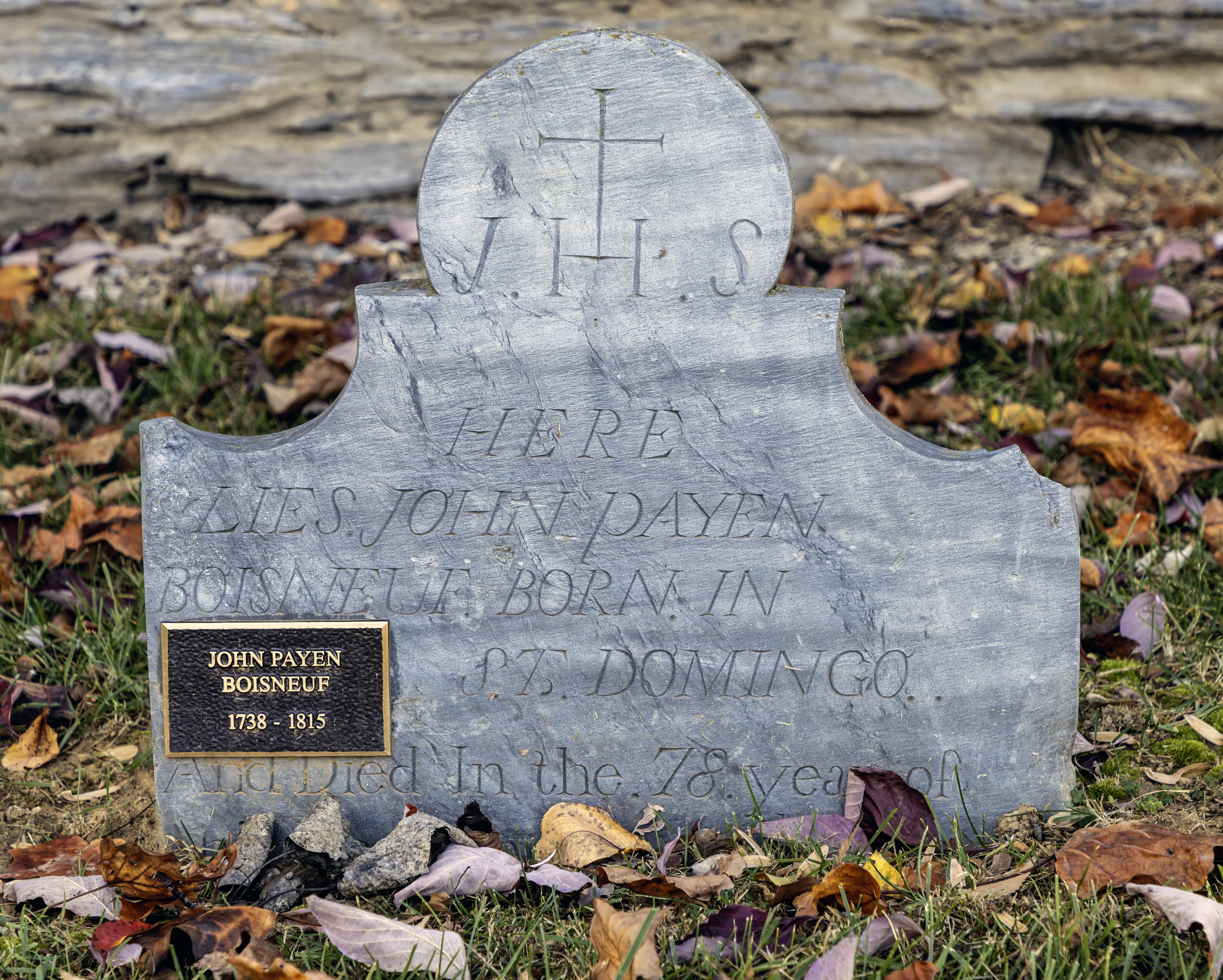
Jean Payen de Boisneuf's grave marker (wiritten as "John Payen Boisneuf). Payen de Boisneuf actually died in 1816

Payen de Boisneuf was named in a court case concerning a slave, Jean Louis, who had been brought from Saint-Domingue to Frederick at Payen de Boisneuf's request around 1792-1793. Pierre Louis escaped from his bondage in 1794. Payen de Boisneuf advertised a bounty for his recapture. Pierre Louis was found in Philadelphia and brought back to Frederick. Three years later, Pierre Louis petitioned the court for freedom, supported by several local citizens, who themselves owned slaves. A jury found that Payen de Boisneuf did not own Jean Louis when he was brought to the United States, and under the terms of Maryland law, he had been brought illegally, making Jean Pierre free under the law.

In 1799 Payen de Boisneuf was found guilty of cruelty to a slave named Shadrack, and of "not sufficiently clothing and feeding his negroes."

Jean Payen de Boisneuf died in October 1816, at 78 years. He is buried at St. John's Cemetery in Frederick, Maryland.

L'Hermitage Plantation, also known as the Best Farm, forms part of Monocacy National Battlefield, and was fought over during the Battle of Monocacy in the American Civil War. The house is preserved by the National Park Service, and is listed on the National Register of Historic Places as L'Hermitage Slave Village Archeological Site.

== Writings of Jean Payen de Boisneuf ==
- Letter to the French - 1793. Manifesto of Payen-Boisneuf to the colonists of Saint-Domingue.
- To John Adams from Jean Payen de Boisneuf
