= John Haydon =

John Haydon may refer to:

- John A. Haydon, American surveyor and civil engineer
- John Morse Haydon, governor of American Samoa
