= St. John's Cemetery, Frederick, Maryland =

Catholic cemetery, established 1845

St. John’s Cemetery
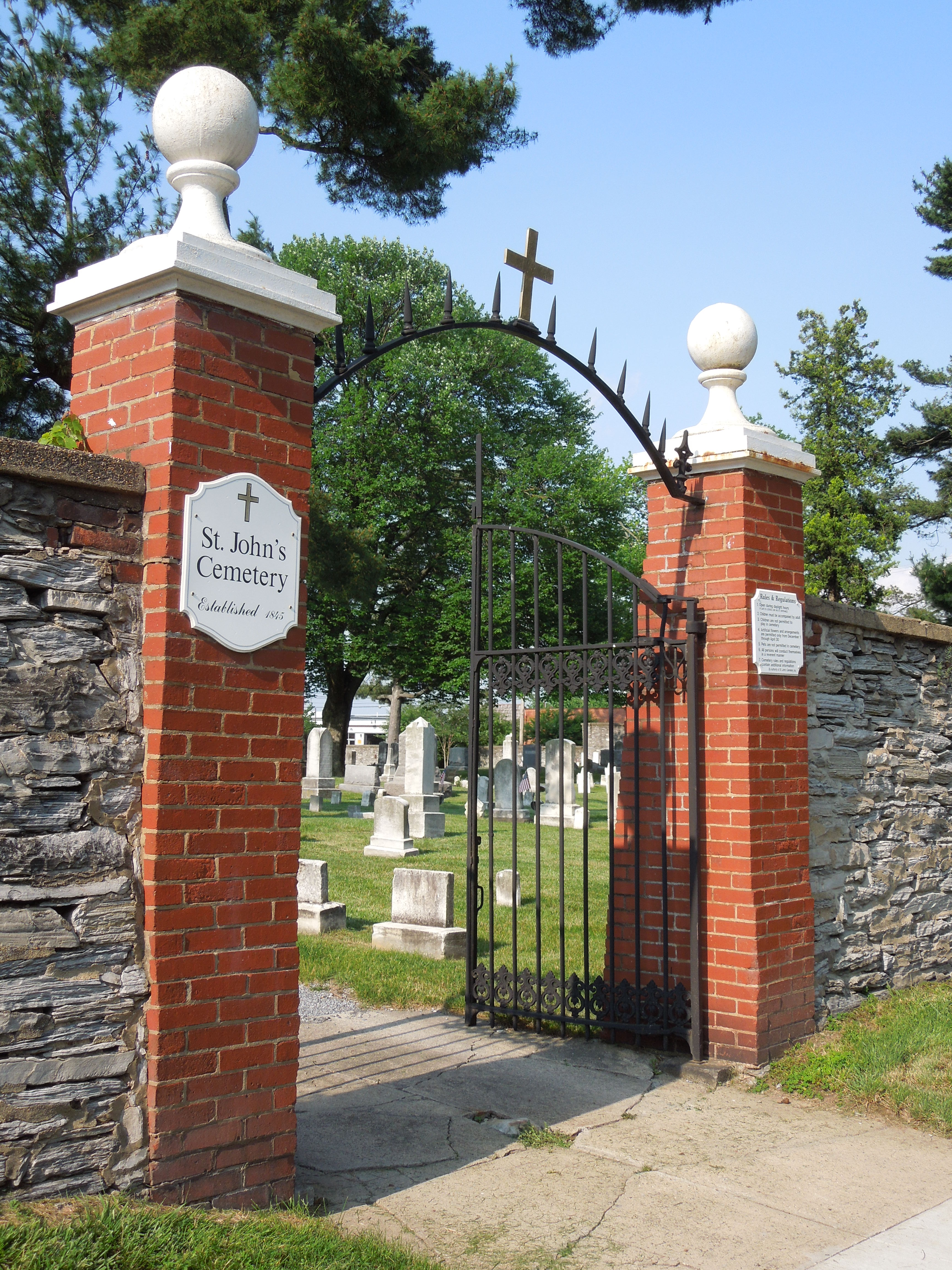
- Interactive map of St. John’s Cemetery

Details
- Established: 1845 (first burial in 1832)
- Location: Frederick, Maryland
- Country: United States
- Coordinates: 39°25′5.56″N 77°24′19.93″W
- Type: Roman Catholic
- Website: www.stjohnscemetery-md.org

St. John's Cemetery is a Roman Catholic cemetery located in Frederick, Maryland. The cemetery is operated by St. John the Evangelist Holy Catholic Church in Frederick, Maryland. The cemetery is located at East 3rd Street Frederick, Maryland 21701.

== History ==
The grounds which would become St. John's Cemetery was first used as a cemetery for the interment of Henry, a free black man who died of cholera in 1832. St. John's Cemetery was officially established in 1845.

St John's Cemetery contains a number of graves from French settlers who fled the St. Domingue Slave revolt of 1791. The family of Etienne Bellumeau de la Vincendière made their way to Frederick, Maryland possibly via Charleston, South Carolina. Etienne established himself in Charleston and was moved to Frederick to be buried in the family plot with his wife Marguerite. His eldest daughter Victoire, acquired the land and managed L’Hermitage plantation, notorious for the poor treatment of its many slaves, her sister Adelaide and her nephew Enoch Louis Lowe are also buried at St John's Cemetery. Lowe would become the 29th Governor of Maryland. Jean Payen de Boisneuf, brother of Etienne, is buried nearby. Boisneuf was among the many French nationals who condemned Marie Antoinette to death in France on October 16, 1793. Three French soldiers are buried at St. John's Cemetery. Francis Luber and Herman Weber fought for Napoleon Bonaparte at the battle of Waterloo. Peter Nicolas Simard, buried nearby, was a member of the National Order of the Legion of Honour.

There are 3 soldiers from the Revolutionary War, 1 from the French and Indian War, 17 from the War of 1812, 16 confederate and 34 union soldiers from the American Civil War, as well as veterans from World War I, World War II, Korean War and Vietnam War.

In 1998, 10 union soldiers were dedicated at St. John's Cemetery. For the prior 138 years they had been in graves without headstones. Funeral director and amateur historian Keith Roberson identified the soldiers after 4 years and research. Mr. Roberson requested that the Veterans Administration provide the headstones, which they did, as they are required to by law. A 25-year-old man, who was hanged on December 24, 1861, for killing his superior officer on September 22, 1861, also received a marker but was not dedicated.

== St. John’s Cemetery Chapel ==
The St. John's Cemetery Chapel was converted from a storage shed into a chapel. The official ground breaking was in 2003, and the chapel was blessed in the fall of 2009. A small flagstone courtyard, flanked by stone benches leads to the chapel, whose exterior was finished to complement the exterior of St John's the Evangelist Roman Catholic Church on East Second Street. Above the entrance hangs a small iron cross that was found on the property, which originally marked the burial site of an unknown Union soldier. The entrance is made up to two sets of doors, the outer gate, which originally served as the cemeteries Fourth Street entrance gates, and the inner full glass doors.

The flagstone from the courtyard continues inside the chapel. Opposite the doors is a large glass window with a crucifix created using the frame of the window as the cross and a large corpus statue hanging from it. The ceiling is made of yellow pine and has exposed rafters. The altar, constructed of maple and birch was created by a local artist. Above the entrance hangs a wood and plaster crucifix once owned by John McElroy, SJ, who is also buried in the cemetery.

== Jesuit Novitiate Cemetery ==
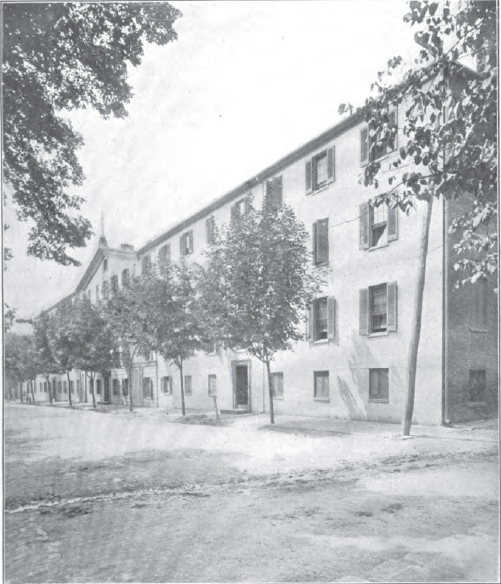
St Stanislaus Novitiate

A Jesuit cemetery was established in 1805 by Father John Dubois on the grounds of the Jesuit novitiate, which once stood on East Second Street. In 1903, the Jesuit novitiate in Frederick closed and graves were moved from the Frederick Jesuit Novitiate Cemetery to St. John's Cemetery. 79 Jesuits along with others including Chief Justice Roger Brooke Taney were relocated to St. John's cemetery.

== Notable burials ==
- Louis Victor Baughman (1845-1906), Maryland Comptroller (1888-1892), President of the C&O Canal, President of the Frederick, Northern & Gettysburg Electric Railway Company
- John A. Haydon (1830–1902), surveyor and engineer
- Outerbridge Horsey (1777-1842), U.S. Senator from Delaware
- Roger Brooke Taney (1777-1864), 5th Chief Justice of the Supreme Court of the United States of America, 12th U.S. Secretary of the Treasury, 11th U.S. States Attorney General, and U.S. Secretary of War.
- John McElroy, SJ (1782-1877), Jesuit Priest, one of the first Catholic U.S. Army Chaplains and Founder of Boston College/Boston College High School
- Enoch Louis Lowe (1820-1892), 29th Governor of Maryland
- Leonard Smith (), Founded Brunswick, Maryland and Jefferson, Maryland
- John Tehan (-1868), Architect of St. John the Evangelist Roman Catholic Church in Frederick, Maryland

== See also ==
- List of burial places of justices of the Supreme Court of the United States
