= John McElroy (Jesuit) =

Jesuit founder of Boston College (1782–1877)

The Reverend John McElroy SJ
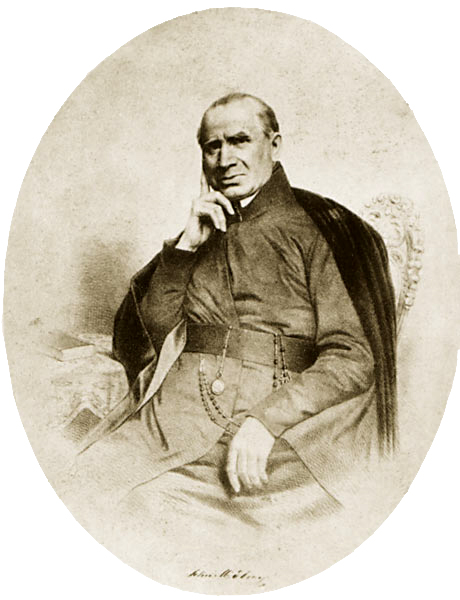
- Born: 14 May 1782; Enniskillen, Ireland
- Died: 12 September 1877 (aged 95); Frederick, Maryland, U.S.
- Resting place: St. John's Cemetery
- Education: Georgetown University College of Arts & Sciences
- Known for: Founder of St. John's Literary Institution, First Catholic Army Chaplain (US Army), Founder of Boston College High School, Founder of Boston College

John McElroy SJ (14 May 1782 – 12 September 1877) was a Jesuit priest who founded Catholic schools in the United States. After immigrating to the United States in 1803, McElroy enrolled in Georgetown University in 1806, the same year in which he joined the Society of Jesus as a lay brother. His brother Anthony also became a Jesuit. McElroy assumed the management of Georgetown's financial affairs. He was ordained a priest in 1817. In 1822 he was sent to Frederick, Maryland, where he was to remain for 23 years as pastor of St. John the Evangelist Catholic Church in downtown Frederick. It was in Frederick that he founded St. John's Literary Institution. During the Mexican–American War, McElroy served as an Army chaplain, and on his return from Mexico he went to Boston, where he established Boston College and Boston College High School.

== Early years ==
John McElroy was born 14 May 1782 in Enniskillen, Ireland, the younger of two sons. In the hopes of providing a better life for John and his brother Anthony, their father, a farmer, financed their travel to the United States of America. In 1803 the two young men boarded a ship leaving the port of Londonderry and arriving in Baltimore, Maryland, on 26 August. McElroy eventually settled in Georgetown, Washington, D.C., and became a merchant.

== Georgetown ==
In 1806 McElroy entered Georgetown College in Washington, D.C., the same year he entered the novitiate of the Society of Jesus as a lay brother. McElroy eventually managed the finances of Georgetown College and in 1808 erected the tower building. McElroy managed the school's finances so well that through the period of economic hardship following the War of 1812, he was able to send several Jesuits to Rome to study.

McElroy was ordained in May 1817, after less than two years of preparation. As a new priest, he was assigned to Holy Trinity Catholic Church in Georgetown as an assistant pastor. In his short time at Trinity, he contributed to the growth of the congregation and enlarged of the church building. This was achieved by increasing the monthly subscription for congregation members from 12½ cents to $12.50 on 3 July 1819. The following day he travelled to most of the congregation members' homes and collected $2000 in pledges. He immediately set to work having the Church modified to include 2 lateral-wing chapels, which were first used on 3 October 1819.

On 11 January 1819, McElroy was granted United States citizenship.

In 1819, McElroy started a Sunday School for black children who were taught prayers and catechism simultaneously with spelling and reading, by volunteer members of the congregation. McElroy spent his remaining years in Georgetown teaching the lower grades.

In the years leading up to the 1838 Jesuit slave sale, McElroy was, as clerk of Georgetown College, responsible for issuing runaway slave advertisements and return rewards.

== Frederick ==
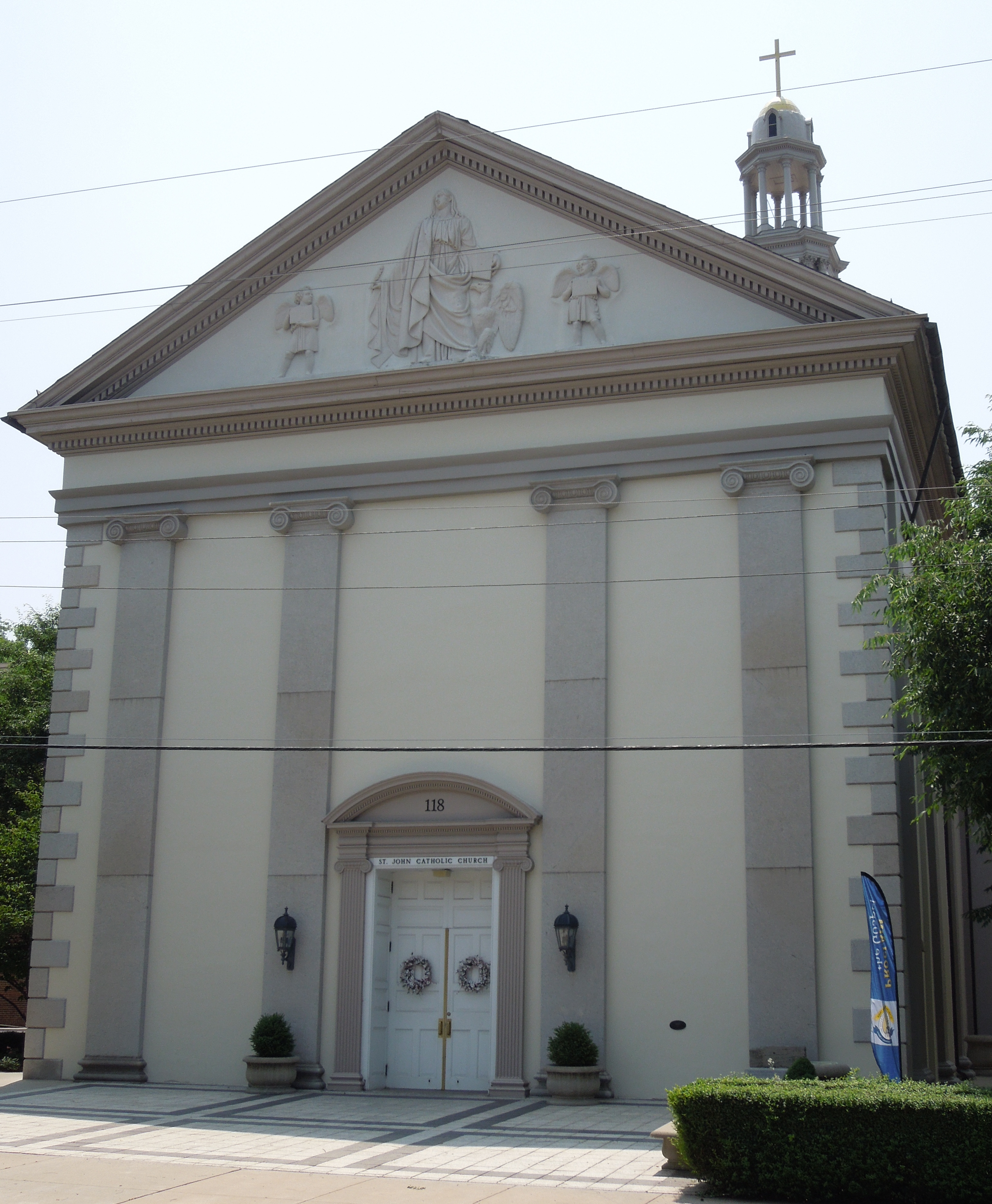
St John the Evangelist Church, Frederick, Maryland

One of McElroy's first known interactions with the Catholic community in Frederick, Maryland, was around 1804 when he gave money to Fr. John Dubois, the pastor in Frederick, to support St. John the Evangelist Church.

In 1822, Dubois' successor Fr. Maleve fell ill. McElroy travelled to Frederick to minister to him in illness and was with him when he died on 3 October. A letter was sent by a number of prominent gentlemen from Frederick to the superior of the Jesuits at Whitemarsh, Maryland, requesting the services of McElroy in Frederick. and in 1822 he was appointed pastor there.

McElroy set to work immediately to expand the congregation. In 1823 he began negotiations with the Sisters of Charity in Emmitsburg, Maryland, for the establishment of a school for girls in Frederick. In 1824, the St. John's Benevolent Female Free School was founded by the Sisters of Charity of Saint Joseph at 200 East Second Street in Frederick. In 1825, McElroy set to work replacing the structure that housed the school, a pre-American Revolution log cabin, with a modern building large enough to also house an orphanage. The money raised for construction was primarily accomplished due to support of the orphanage.

McElroy's next task was to found an educational institution for boys. On 7 August 1828, the construction of St John's Literary Institute began. The following year the construction was completed and the school was opened, a school which is currently operating under the name of Saint John's Catholic Prep.

In 1833 McElroy worked with John Tehan, a well-known local architect, to create a plan for a new church. St. John the Evangelist Roman Catholic Church was consecrated on 26 April 1837, the first Roman Catholic Church consecrated in what was then the United States. When the Church was completed it was the largest parish Church in the United States of America.

== Mexican War ==
Shortly after the Mexican-American War began in 1846, many Irish Catholic immigrants joined the U.S. forces in Mexico. The religious needs of these soldiers were not being met. In a discussion between the President of the United States of America, James K. Polk, and Archbishop John Hughes of New York, it was decided that for the first time, Roman Catholic priests would join US Army forces as chaplains. Father McElroy and Father Anthony Rey were selected by the Archbishop and were sent to Mexico; they joined General Zachary Taylor's army in Matamoros on 5 July 1846.

McElroy, then 64, stayed at the base camp in Matamoros, tending to the casualties, saying Mass, and hearing confessions. In May 1847, McElroy was withdrawn from Mexico due to continuous illnesses. Father Rey died for his efforts at the hand of guerrillas.

== Boston ==
In October 1847 McElroy was welcomed in Boston by the Bishop of Boston, John Bernard Fitzpatrick, to serve as pastor of St. Mary's parish in the North End. Bishop Fitzpatrick set McElroy to work on bringing a college to Boston.

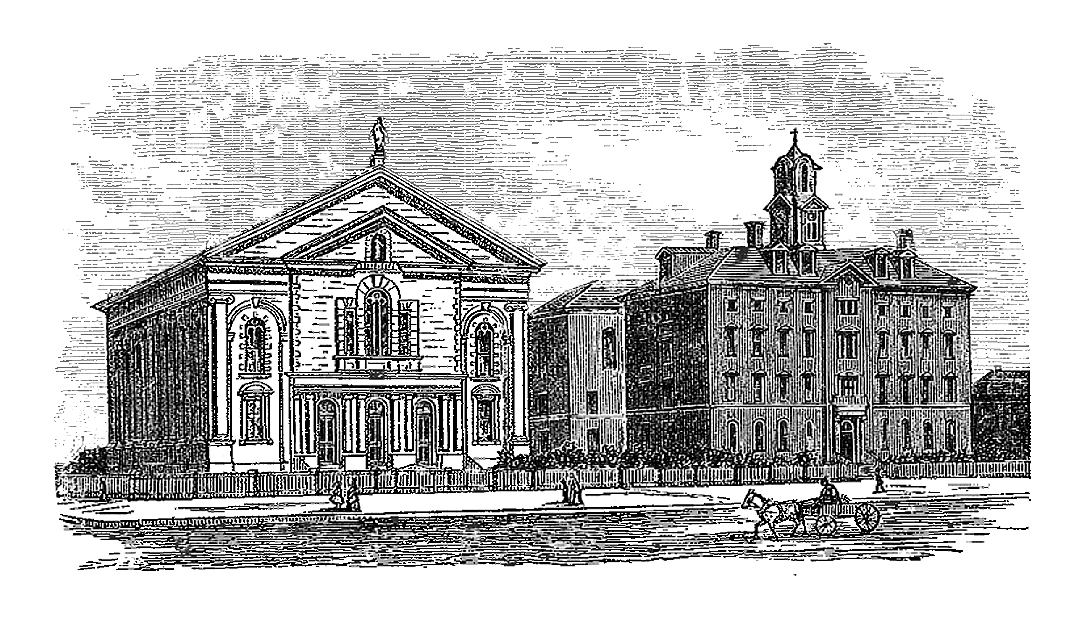
Church of the Immaculate Conception (left) and Boston College (right) (1860) in Boston's South End

In 1853 McElroy found a property in the South End where the city jail once stood. After two years of negotiations the project fell through due to zoning issues.

A new site was identified and city officials endorsed the sale. Two important gifts were received, a bequest of $3000 from Joseph Coolidge Shaw, and $5000 plus all construction expenses from Catholic philanthropist Andrew Carney. In 1858, Bishop Fitzpatrick and Father McElroy broke ground for Boston College, and for the Church of the Immaculate Conception. McElroy served as the pastor of Immaculate Conception Church from 1861 to 1863. Classes began in the fall of 1864, and would continue at this location until 1913 when the college moved to its current location at Chestnut Hill.

Initially Boston College offered a seven-year program including both high school and college. This joint program continued until 1927 when the high school was separately incorporated.

== Memorials ==
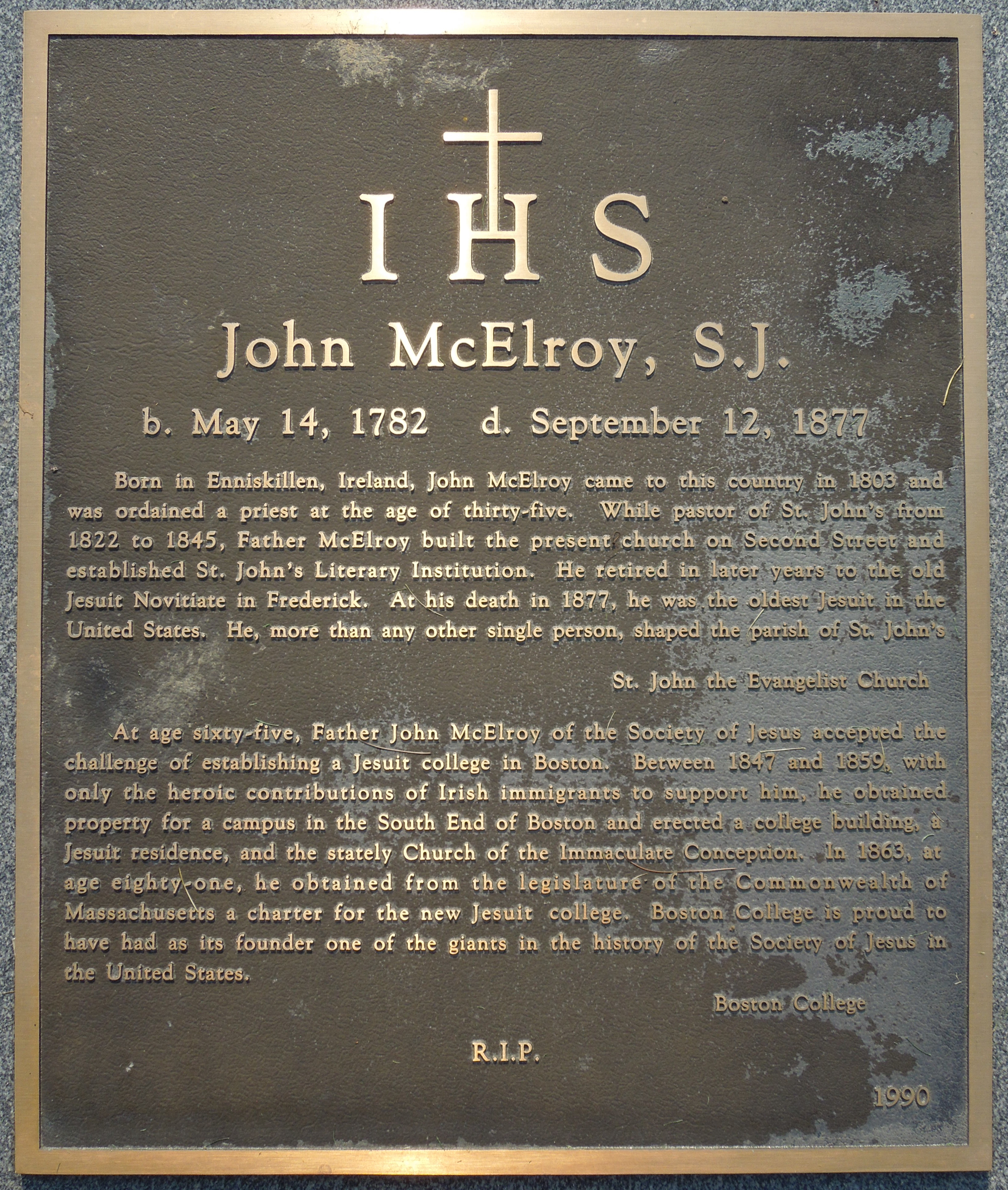
John McElroy plaque at St. John's Cemetery

=== Memorial buildings ===
- McElroy Commons (Boston College) – dedicated on 9 November 1961.
- McElroy Hall (Boston College High School) – opened in 1950.
- McElroy Hall (Saint Katharine Drexel Church) – Frederick, Maryland.

=== Memorial awards ===
- The John McElroy Award – Inaugurated in 1992, a plaque is awarded annually to individuals whose actions or achievements have advanced Catholic school education in Frederick, Maryland. The plaque is a bas relief created by artist William M. Cochran.
- Father John McElroy Founder's Award – an award given by Saint John's Catholic Prep to a student who best exemplifies the school's Jesuit roots.

== Retirement and death ==
In 1868 McElroy retired to the Jesuit novitiate in Frederick. In 1872 he visited Georgetown for his final time to celebrate his golden jubilee. His eyesight was failing and while moving through his home he fell, fracturing his femur, which would eventually lead to his death at the Jesuit novitiate in Frederick. For some years leading up to his death, he was regarded as the oldest priest in the United States and the oldest Jesuit in the world. He was buried in the Novitiate Cemetery. In 1903 the Jesuits withdrew from Frederick and the graves were moved from the Frederick Jesuit Novitiate Cemetery (1805–1904) to St. John's Cemetery.

Catholic Church titles
New title	1st Pastor of Immaculate Conception Church; 1861–1863	Succeeded by John Bapst
