= Enoch Louis Lowe =

American politician (1820-1892)

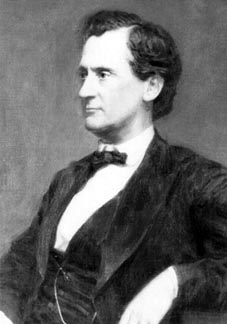

29th Governor of Maryland
- In office January 6, 1851 – January 11, 1854
- Preceded by: Philip F. Thomas
- Succeeded by: Thomas W. Ligon

Member of the Maryland House of Delegates from the Frederick County district
- In office 1845–1845 Serving with Daniel S. Biser, Henry Boteler, Francis J. Hoover, George Zollinger
- Preceded by: Daniel S. Biser, Edward Buckey, William Cost Johnson, Thomas E. D. Poole, Edward Shriver, John H. Worthington
- Succeeded by: George Doub, Peter Grabill, Jeremiah G. Morrison, Jacob Root, James Stevens, Thomas Turner

Personal details
- Born: August 10, 1820 Frederick County, Maryland U.S.
- Died: August 23, 1892 (aged 72) Brooklyn, New York, U.S.
- Resting place: St. John’s Cemetery
- Party: Democratic
- Spouse: Esther Winder Polk (m. 1844)
- Children: 11
- Education: Stonyhurst College

Enoch Louis Lowe (August 10, 1820 – August 23, 1892) was an American politician who served as the 29th governor of Maryland in the United States from 1851 to 1854.

== Early life ==
He was the only child of Bradley Samuel Adams Lowe and Adelaide Bellumeau de la Vincendrière. He was born on August 10, 1820, in the manor-house of The Hermitage, on the Monocacy River, Frederick County, Maryland. At thirteen he entered Clongowes Wood College, Ireland, where he was schoolmates with Thomas Francis Meagher. Three years later he matriculated at Stonyhurst College, England, where he was friends with Francis Mahony and Miles Gerard Keon, the novelist. He graduated first in his class in 1839.

Studying with Judge John A. Lynch, of Frederick, he was admitted to the bar in 1842.

== Family ==
In 1844, Lowe married Esther Winder Polk, of Somerset County, Maryland, daughter of James Polk and cousin of James Knox Polk. They had eleven children of whom seven survived: Adelaide Victoire, married E. Austin Jenkins; Anna Maria, religieuse of the Sacred Heart, died 1889; Paul Emelius; Vivian Polk; Victoire Vincendiere, married John M. Stubbs; Enoch Louis; Esther Polk; Mary Gorter, married Francis de Sales Jenkins.

== Political career ==
Lowe was a member of the Maryland House of Delegates, representing Frederick County in 1845, a member of the Democratic National Convention in 1856 and a U.S. Presidential elector in 1860. Lowe took the oath of office as Governor of Maryland on January 6, 1851. The most important events of his administration were the adoption of the Maryland Constitution of 1851, the completion of the Baltimore and Ohio Railroad to the Ohio River and a reduction of the state tax rate from 25 to 15 cents on a $100.

As of 2022, he is the last governor of Maryland to have lived in Frederick County.

== Civil War and later life ==
He supported the Confederacy during the Civil War. During the war, he lived at Richmond, Virginia, and Milledgeville, Georgia. After the war, he moved to Brooklyn, New York, joining the law firm of Richard F. Clarke and W. H. Morgan.

He is mentioned in the song "Maryland, My Maryland", which later became the state anthem.

He died at St. Mary's Hospital, Brooklyn, on August 23, 1892. He is buried at Saint John's Cemetery in Frederick, Maryland.

== Assessment ==
He was, perhaps, the greatest stump speaker of his day. ... Few young men ever had a more brilliant career in this state than Enoch Louis Lowe. ... He had the advantage of collegiate training abroad, with which was combined a pleasing address, winning speech and clear-cut, States' rights, patriotic principles.

— The Baltimore Sun, August 24, 1892,

James McSherry, Chief Judge of the Court of Appeals of Maryland, writing to a member of his family, paid this tribute to Lowe's memory:

The superb attainments of your father as a forensic and popular orator were perhaps never equalled by anyone who ever lived in this country.

Party political offices
Preceded by Philip Francis Thomas	Democratic nominee for Governor of Maryland; 1850	Succeeded by Thomas Watkins Ligon
Political offices
Preceded by Philip Thomas	Governor of Maryland; 1851–1854	Succeeded by Thomas W. Ligon
