= Ballenger Creek, Maryland =

- Census-designated place
- Location of Ballenger Creek, Maryland
- Coordinates: 39°22′54″N 77°24′58″W
- Country: United States
- State: Maryland
- County: Frederick

Area
  - Total: 10.81 sq mi (28.00 km^{2})
  - Land: 10.80 sq mi (27.96 km^{2})
  - Water: 0.015 sq mi (0.04 km^{2})
- Elevation: 295 ft (90 m)

Population (2020)
  - Total: 24,999
  - Density: 2,315.6/sq mi (894.04/km^{2})
- Time zone: UTC−5 (Eastern (EST))
  - Summer (DST): UTC−4 (EDT)
- Area codes: 301, 240
- FIPS code: 24-03800
- GNIS feature ID: 2389170

Ballenger Creek is an unincorporated community and census-designated place (CDP) in Frederick County, Maryland, United States. It is a part of the Frederick, Maryland urban area and is adjacent to Frederick's southern city limits. The CDP had a 2010 census population of 18,274.

== Geography ==
Ballenger Creek is located in south-central Frederick County at 39°22′54″N 77°25′58″W (39.381593, −77.432802). The namesake stream flows west to east through the community towards the Monocacy River, part of the Potomac River watershed.

According to the United States Census Bureau, the CDP has a total area of 10.8 square miles (28.1 km^{2}), of which 0.02 square miles (0.04 km^{2}), or 0.14%, is water.

== Demographics ==
Historical population
Census	Pop.	Note	%±
1990	5,546		—
2000	13,518		143.7%
2010	18,274		35.2%
2020	24,999		36.8%

=== 2020 census ===
As of the 2020 census, Ballenger Creek had a population of 24,999. The median age was 35.1 years. 24.9% of residents were under the age of 18 and 10.4% of residents were 65 years of age or older. For every 100 females there were 91.3 males, and for every 100 females age 18 and over there were 88.8 males age 18 and over.

99.5% of residents lived in urban areas, while 0.5% lived in rural areas.

There were 9,426 households in Ballenger Creek, of which 36.0% had children under the age of 18 living in them. Of all households, 46.3% were married-couple households, 16.1% were households with a male householder and no spouse or partner present, and 30.3% were households with a female householder and no spouse or partner present. About 27.8% of all households were made up of individuals and 10.6% had someone living alone who was 65 years of age or older.

There were 9,897 housing units, of which 4.8% were vacant. The homeowner vacancy rate was 1.5% and the rental vacancy rate was 6.3%.

Racial composition as of the 2020 census
Race	Number	Percent
White	13,156	52.6%
Black or African American	5,011	20.0%
American Indian and Alaska Native	142	0.6%
Asian	1,927	7.7%
Native Hawaiian and Other Pacific Islander	26	0.1%
Some other race	1,804	7.2%
Two or more races	2,933	11.7%
Hispanic or Latino (of any race)	4,073	16.3%

=== 2010 census ===
As of the census of 2010, 18,274 people, 6,932 households, and 4,558 families reside in the CDP. The population density was 1,692.0 inhabitants per square mile (653.3/km^{2}). There were 7,372 housing units at an average density of 682.0 per square mile (263.3/km^{2}). The racial makeup of the CDP was 69.7% White, 15.6% African American, 0.4% Native American, 6.6% Asian, 0.1% Pacific Islander, 3.2% from other races, and 4.3% from two or more races. Hispanic or Latino of any race were 10.1% of the population.

There were 4,542 households, which 24.9% had children under 18 living with them, 47.4% were married couples living together, 12.6% had a female householder with no husband present, and 35.7% were non-families. 28.5% of all households were made up of individuals, and 9.5% had someone living alone who was 65 years of age or older. The average household size was 2.57 and the average family size was 3.22.

In the CDP, the population was spread out, with 26.7% under 18, 8.5% from 18 to 24, 34.3% from 25 to 44, 22.4% from 45 to 64, and 8.1% who were 65 years of age or older. The median age was 33.5 years. For every 100 females, there were 96.9 males. For every 100 females age 18 and over, there were 94.9 males.

The median income for a household in the CDP was $56,558, and the median income for a family was $65,216. Males had a median income of $42,350 versus $31,233 for females. The per capita income for the CDP was $24,816. About 3.2% of families and 3.6% of the population were below the poverty line, including 3.9% of those under age 18 and 5.8% of those age 65 or over.

== Economy ==
Ballenger Creek's establishment as an urban community and continued development has been strongly tied to the presence of numerous corporate and technology companies located within the I-270 Technology Corridor. Ballenger Creek is the site of many of the corporate parks that contribute substantially to the Frederick area economy, including Frederick Research Park, Stanford Industrial Park, Westview South, Westview Village, Wedgewood Business Park, McKinney Industrial Park, Westview Corporate Campus, Ballenger Center, Frederick Corporate Park and 270 Technology Park.

Roy Rogers Restaurants is headquartered in the CDP.

== Education ==
It is in Frederick County Public Schools.

School zoning is as follows: Elementary schools with parts of the CDP in their attendance boundaries include:

- Ballenger Creek Elementary School - In the CDP
- Orchard Grove Elementary School - In the CDP
- Tuscarora Elementary School - In the CDP
- Carroll Manor Elementary School

Two middle schools in the CDP include portions of the CDP in their attendance boundaries: Ballenger Creek Middle School and Crestwood Middle School. Tuscarora High School is the zoned high school of the CDP.

== Historic sites ==
Parts of the Monocacy National Battlefield are in the CDP.
