= 14th New Jersey Volunteer Infantry Monument =

Monument located on the Monocacy battlefield in Frederick, Maryland, US

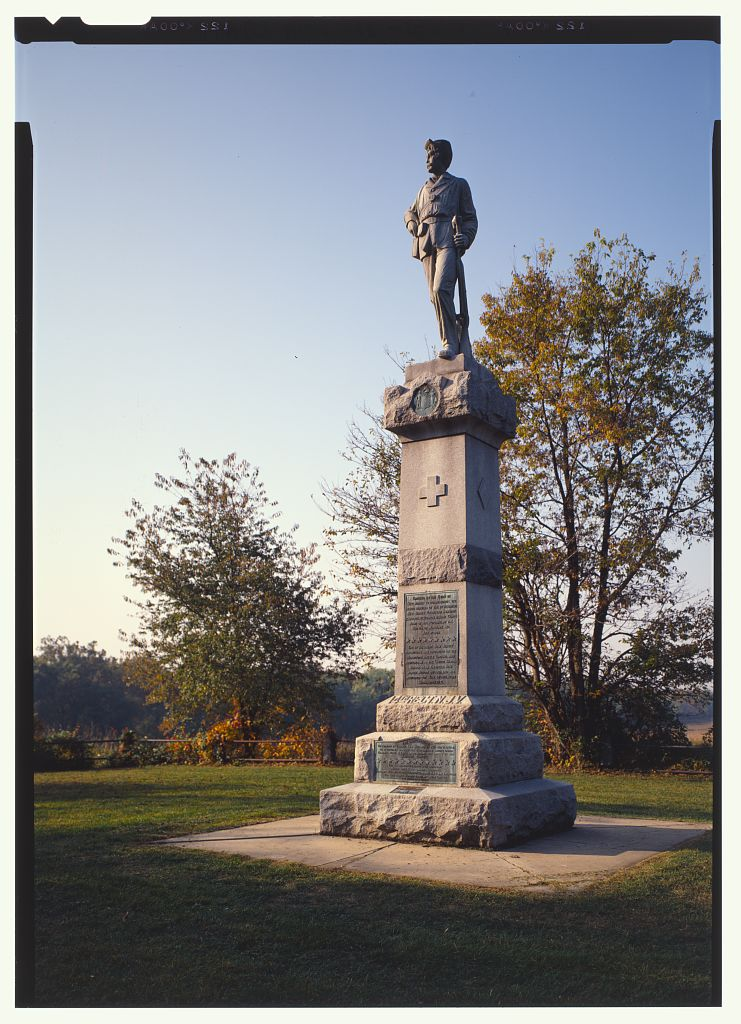
- Location: Monocacy National Battlefield, Maryland, US
- Coordinates: 39°22′14.52″N 77°23′33.36″W
- Completion date: July 11, 1907

The 14th New Jersey monument is a memorial monument located on the Monocacy battlefield in Frederick, Maryland, United States. It stands to honor the men of the volunteer force that protected the Monocacy Junction during the crucial winter of 1863-1864. Their halting of Confederate troops from advancing Northward played a significant role in the Union territory control.

== Construction and dedication ==
"The monument is constructed of granite and measures about 24 feet high, topped by a sculpture of an infantry soldier. The front of the monument features a Greek cross along with two bronze tablets. The 14th New Jersey Monument was the first of five monuments to be erected on the battlefield. The dedication ceremony, held on July 11, 1907, was attended by 180 survivors of the regiment."

The monument was restored and rededicated in 2007.
