= Sylvanus T. Rugg =

Union Army officer (1734–1881)

Sylvanus Tunning Rugg
- Born: 1834; Taunton, Massachusetts, U.S.
- Died: 1881 (aged 46–47); Minneapolis, Minnesota, U.S.
- Military career
- Allegiance: United States
- Branch: Union Army
- Commands: 2nd U. S. Artillery
- Conflicts: American Civil War

Sylvanus Tunning Rugg (1834 – May 4, 1881) was an officer in the Union Army who commanded an artillery battery at the Battle of Gettysburg during the American Civil War, as well as in other leading battles of the Army of the Potomac. He also served in the Western Theater late in his career.

== Biography ==
Rugg was born in Taunton, Massachusetts in 1834. Early in the war, he became a brevet second lieutenant in the 2nd U. S. Artillery, a promotion dated October 22, 1862. He received permanent promotion to that rank in the 4th U. S. Artillery on the same date. There is no record of Rugg's having attended a military school, suggesting he was promoted from the ranks.

Rugg commanded Battery F, 4th U.S. Artillery in the artillery brigade of the XII Corps at Gettysburg. Lt. Edward D. Muhlenberg, who had commanded the battery, was in charge of the brigade by seniority. Battery F reached Gettysburg on July 1, 1863, and advanced to a position near the Hanover Road to support the advance of the 1st Division under Brig. Gen. Alpheus S. Williams to Benner's Hill. The battery arrived with 120 men and 6 Napoleons, 12-pounder smoothbore guns; see Field artillery in the American Civil War. On July 2 it covered a gap in the Union lines, but on July 3 it was posted near the Baltimore Pike to bombard the portion of Culp's Hill the Confederates had captured on the previous day. It participated in a bombardment of the Confederates that helped drive them from their advanced position. One man was wounded by an artillery round from the bombardment preceding Pickett's Charge that flew over the Union lines on Cemetery Ridge. The battery's monument stands at the intersection of Hunt Avenue and the Baltimore Pike on the battlefield.

Rugg continued to serve in the Union army through the autumn 1863 campaigns in Tennessee when the XII Corps was reassigned to the Western Theater. He was dismissed from the service on July 22, 1864.

Rugg died of Bright's disease on May 4, 1881, at Cottage Hospital in Minneapolis, Minnesota. He was buried at the Minneapolis Pioneers and Soldiers Memorial Cemetery.
