= Edward D. Muhlenberg =

American railroad engineer and Union Army officer in the American Civil War

- Born: May 15, 1831; Lancaster, Pennsylvania, U.S.
- Died: March 10, 1883 (aged 51); Lancaster, Pennsylvania, U.S.
- Education: Yale University
- Military career
- Allegiance: United States of America
- Branch: United States Army; Union Army
- Service years: 1861–1869
- Units: Battery F, 4th U.S. Artillery
- Commands: Artillery Brigade, XII Corps
- Conflicts: American Civil War; First Battle of Winchester; Battle of Cedar Mountain; Battle of Antietam; Battle of Chancellorsville; Battle of Gettysburg; Battle of Missionary Ridge
- Other work: Civil engineer in the railroad industry (Kansas and Pacific Railroad, Reading and Wilmington Railroad, Texas and Pacific Railway)

Edward Duchman Muhlenberg (May 15, 1831 – March 10, 1883) was an American civil engineer in the railroad industry and an officer in the Union Army during the American Civil War. He commanded an artillery brigade at the Battle of Gettysburg while only a lieutenant. He played an important role in the defense of Culp's Hill against attacking Confederates.

== Early life and career ==
Muhlenberg was born in Lancaster, Pennsylvania, to the prominent Muhlenberg family. He was an 1850 graduate of Yale University. He was engaged until September 1857 as a civil engineer on various railroads and canals in Pennsylvania. In September, 1857, he sailed for Brazil in company with several other civil engineers and artisans to assist in the construction of the Dom Pedro Segundo Railroad, which ran westward from Rio de Janeiro.

== Civil War ==
Several months after outbreak of the Civil War, Muhlenberg returned to the United States and enlisted in the Union Army in Philadelphia. He became a second lieutenant in the 4th U. S. Artillery in October 1861. He was promoted to the rank of first lieutenant on October 22, 1861. Muhlenberg served with Battery F of that regiment at the First Battle of Winchester, May 24–25, 1862. He commanded the battery at the Battle of Cedar Mountain. Muhlenberg retained command at the Battle of Antietam, where he served in the artillery of XII Corps under Capt. Clermont Livingston Best.

After the death of Lt. Franklin B. Crosby, who was senior to him, Muhlenberg resumed command of the battery while serving with XII Corps. At the Battle of Chancellorsville, he commanded batteries attached to Brig. Gen. John W. Geary's division. They were deployed near Chancellorsville itself, protecting the left of XII Corps. At one point, Muhlenberg had 20 guns to direct. Later some of these guns were redeployed from this position to Best's concentration facing Confederate batteries at Hazel Grove.

When Captain Best became inspector general of the corps on the staff of Maj. Gen. Henry W. Slocum, Muhlenberg assumed command of the artillery brigade. Although only a first lieutenant, he was senior to the commanders of the other batteries. (Lt. Sylvanus T. Rugg commanded Battery F while Muhlenberg commanded the brigade.) In the role of brigade commander, Muhlenberg served at the Battle of Gettysburg, especially in the defense of Culp's Hill. Slocum did, however, assign Claremont Best to oversee deployment of the corps’ guns on the morning of July 3, 1863, when a counter attack was made on Confederate forces occupying part of the hill.

Muhlenberg fought at the Battle of Missionary Ridge under Maj. Gen. Joseph Hooker. He then became the adjutant general and quartermaster of the 4th U.S. Artillery on August 13, 1864, and stayed in the Regular Army following the end of the war in April 1865. He resigned on May 8, 1869.

== Postbellum career ==
After his military service ended, Muhlenberg resumed his career as a civil engineer. He was employed on the Kansas and Pacific Railroad from September 1856 to September 1867. He came East and was employed in the construction of the Wilmington and Reading Railroad until January 1870. He served as the engineer of the 1871 Yellowstone survey. His appointment was attributed to Senator Simon Cameron, and he was criticized for his drinking. From June 1871 until January 1872, he surveyed the Texas and Pacific Railway from Fort Phantom Hill to Fort Bliss on the Rio Grande.

When he died of Bright's disease in Lancaster, Pennsylvania, in March 1883, Muhlenberg was described by a newspaper report as a retired major of artillery.

Muhlenberg never married. He was a member of the German Baptist Brethren Church.

== Bibliography ==
- Bigelow, John, Jr., The Campaign of Chancellorsville: A Strategic and Tactical Study, Norwalk, CT: The Eaton Press, 1991.
- Falkenstein, George N., The German Baptist Brethren Or Dunkers. Volume VIII. Lancaster, Pennsylvania: Pennsylvania-German Society, 1900.
- Lubetkin, M. John, "The forgotten Yellowstone surveying expeditions of 1871," Montana: The Magazine of Western History, Winter 2002. Accessed November 1, 2009.
- Officers of the 4th U. S. Artillery (accessed May 30, 2008)
- Pfanz, Harry W., Gettysburg: Culp's Hill and Cemetery Hill, University of North Carolina Press, 1993, ISBN 0-8078-2118-7
- Plumey, Gardiner S.; Colton, Willis S.; & Bissell, Champion, Biographical Record of the Class of 1850 of Yale College. New Haven, Connecticut: Tuttle, Morehouse & Taylor, 1877.
