= Monocacy National Battlefield =

Historic battlefield in Maryland, USA

- Location within Maryland Location within the United States
- Location: Ballenger Creek, Maryland, USA
- Nearest city: Frederick, Maryland
- Coordinates: 39°22′16″N 77°23′31″W
- Area: 1,647 acres (6.67 km^{2})
- Established: June 21, 1934
- Visitors: 116,902 (in 2025)
- Governing body: National Park Service
- Website: Monocacy National Battlefield
- Monocacy National Battlefield
- U.S. National Register of Historic Places
- U.S. National Historic Landmark
- Area: 1,500 acres (610 ha)
- Built: 1864
- NRHP reference No.: 66000908

Significant dates
- Added to NRHP: November 8, 1973
- Designated NHL: November 8, 1973,

Monocacy National Battlefield is a unit of the National Park Service, the site of the Battle of Monocacy in the American Civil War fought on July 9, 1864. The battlefield straddles the Monocacy River in unincorporated Frederick County, Maryland, southeast of the city of Frederick. Portions of the battlefield are in the Ballenger Creek census-designated place.

The battle, labeled "The Battle That Saved Washington," was one of the last the Confederates would carry out in Union territory. The two opposing leaders were General Jubal Early, fighting for the South, and General Lew Wallace, fighting for the North.

== Location ==
Monocacy National Battlefield is located in the center of a region with a number of other Civil War battlefields and sites. It is located on present-day Maryland Route 355 (Urbana Pike) a few miles southeast of the city of Frederick. Nearby Interstate 70 leads westward to Antietam National Battlefield and U.S. Route 15 leads northward to the Gettysburg Battlefield. To the south on U.S. 15 is the battlefield of Ball's Bluff. Monocacy National Battlefield is 50 miles (80 km) west of Baltimore and 44 miles (71 km) northwest of Washington D.C.

== History ==
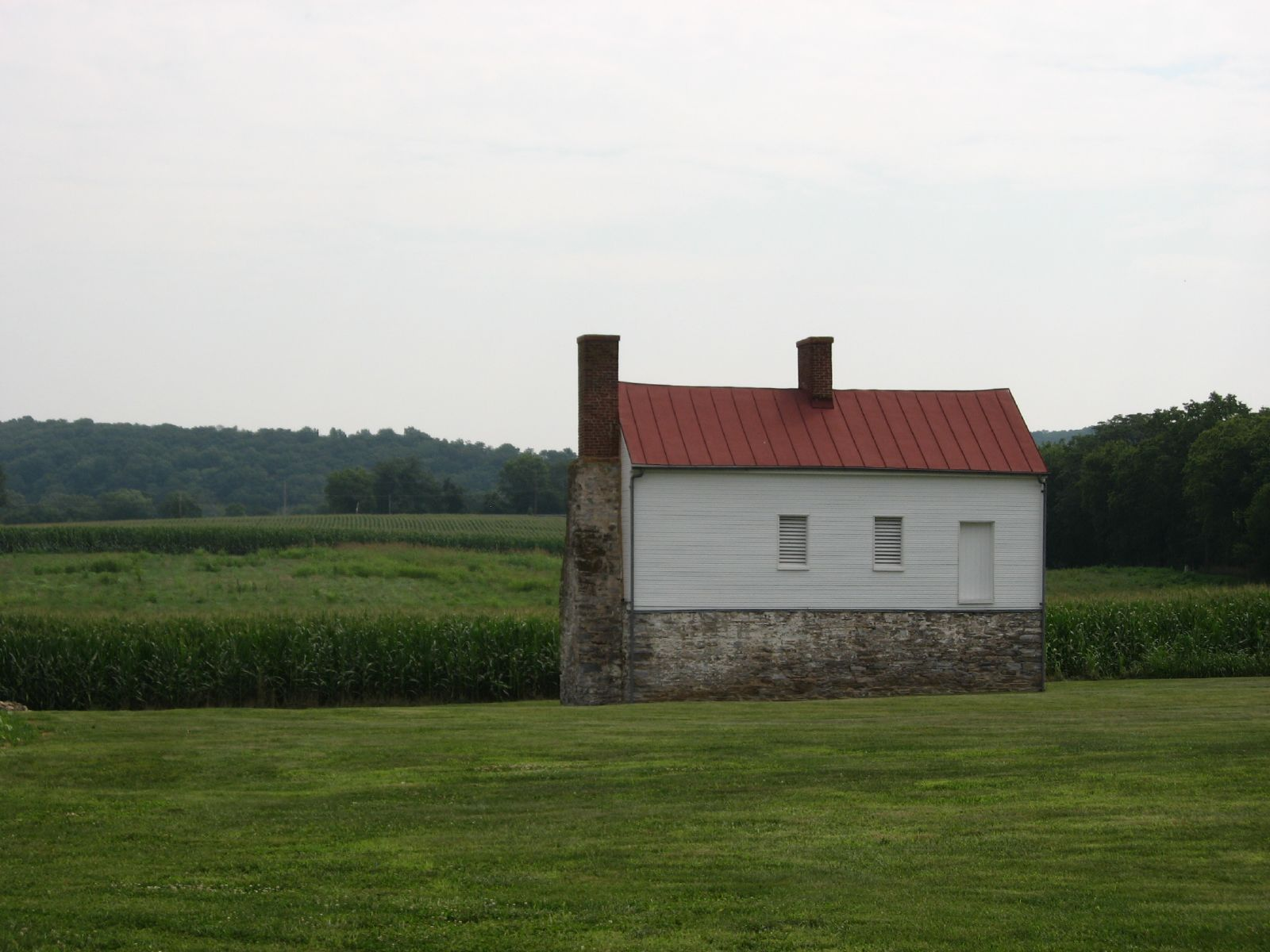
Best Farm, at Monocacy National Battlefield

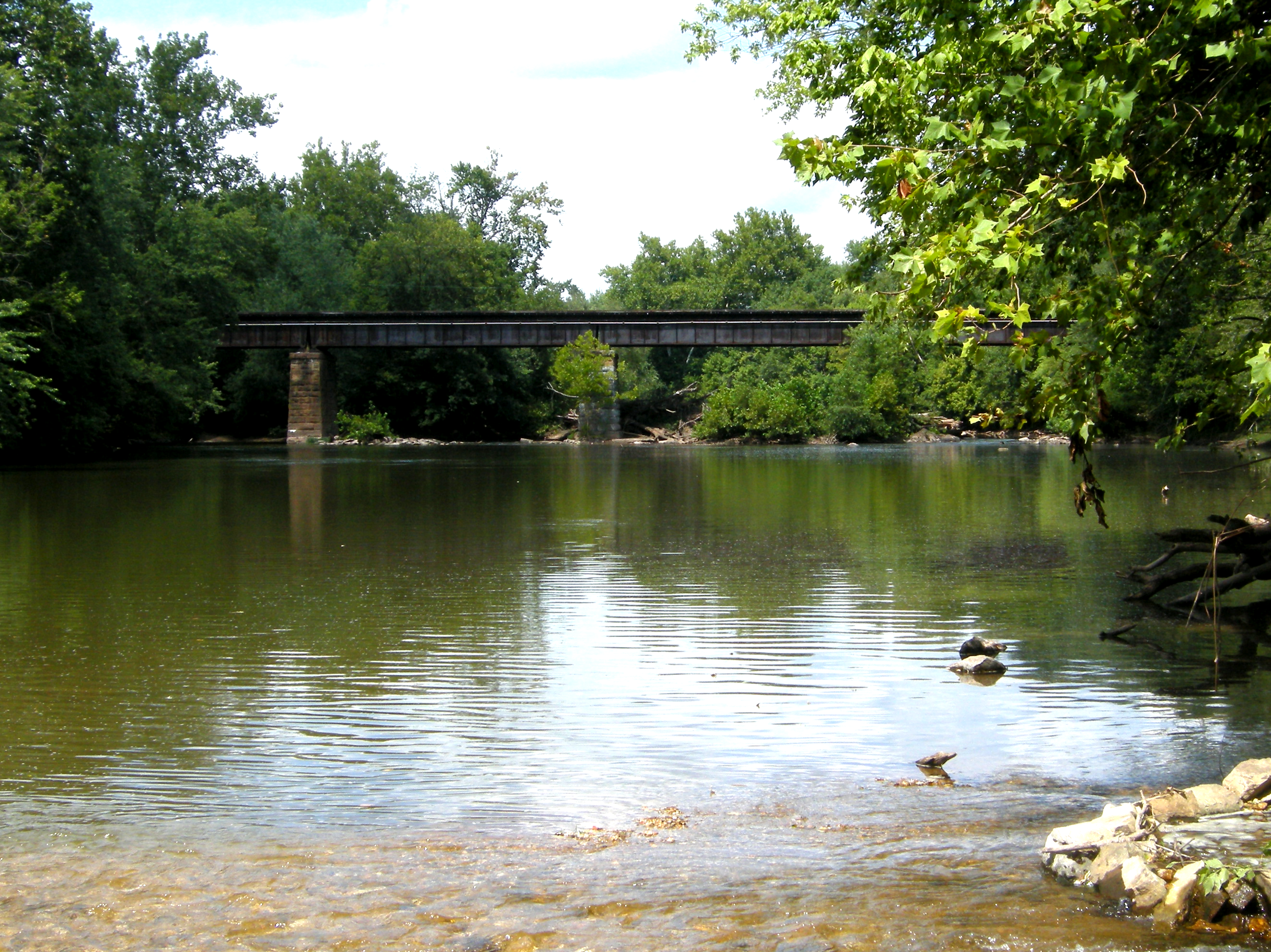
Railroad bridge over the Monocacy River, in the same location as the railroad bridge during the Battle of Monocacy

Much of the Monocacy battlefield remained in private hands for over 100 years after the Civil War. In 1928, Glenn Worthington, the owner of a large portion of the northern segment of the battlefield, petitioned Congress to create a National Military Park at Monocacy. Though the bill passed in 1934, the battlefield languished for nearly 50 years before Congress appropriated funds for land acquisition. Once funds were secured, 1,587 acres (6 km^{2}) of the battlefield were acquired in the late 1970s and turned over to the National Park Service for maintenance and interpretation. The historic Thomas Farm, scene of some of the most intense fighting, was acquired by the National Park Service in 2001. Preservationists lost fights in the 1960s and 1980s when Interstate 270 was constructed and later widened, bisecting a portion of the battlefield.

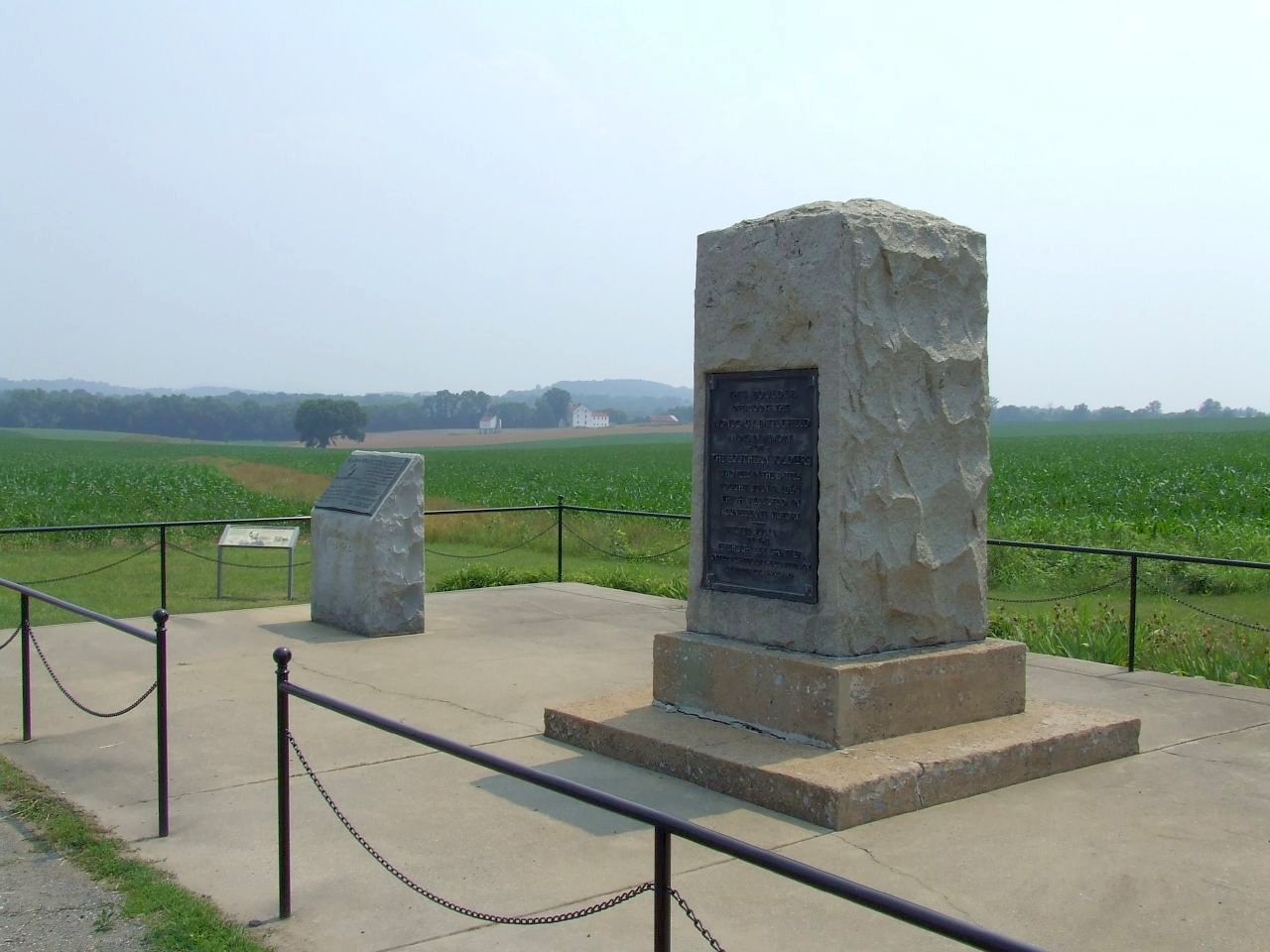
View of battlefield

In the decades following the battle, a few veterans organizations placed commemorative markers to specific units on the battlefield, including the 14th New Jersey (dedicated in 1907), 87th Pennsylvania Infantry, and Vermont markers. In the years that have followed, other monuments have been added, including the Confederate Monument and Maryland Centennial Monument near the Best farm (the site where Union soldiers discovered Robert E. Lee's lost Special Order 191 during the 1862 Maryland Campaign). The National Park Service has since added wayside interpretive markers throughout the park.

The visitor center has been relocated from the historic Gambrill Mill to a new facility on the west side of the Monocacy River. It offers an electric map orientation program, an interactive computer program, interpretive displays, and artifacts of the battle. The visitor center is the starting point for a self-guided four-mile (6 km) auto tour and 1/2 mile (800 m) loop walking trail. National Park Service rangers and volunteers host battle walks, special programs, an auto tour and special events throughout the summer season. The interpretive Worthington Farm Trail, a pair of loops (one nearly two miles (3.2 km) long, the other 1.6 miles (2.6 km)) on the northern portion of the battlefield, allows the visitor to walk parts of the battlefield and explore the native flora of the region.

The National Park Service has recently established a General Management Plan to further interpret the area and acquire additional land if funding can be secured.

In 2013, Preservation Maryland placed the Monocacy National Battlefield on its list of threatened historic properties.

== See also ==
- L'Hermitage Slave Village Archeological Site at the Best Farm, a pre-Civil War plantation founded by immigrants from Haiti
- 14th New Jersey Volunteer Infantry monument
