= John A. Haydon =

American surveyor and civil engineer (1830–1902)

- Born: June 21, 1830; Alexandria, Virginia, U.S.
- Died: September 26, 1902 (aged 72); Frederick, Maryland, U.S.
- Resting place: St. John's Cemetery; Frederick, Maryland, U.S.
- Occupations: surveyor, civil engineer, Railroad executive

John A. Haydon (June 21, 1830 – September 26, 1902) was an American surveyor and civil engineer. As a self-taught civil engineer, Haydon made significant contributions to American railroading. Haydon's railroad career spanned the Baltimore and Ohio railroad expansion to the Ohio River in 1853 and several other railroads to the last transcontinental railroad, the Northern Pacific railway. Haydon led the 1872 Yellowstone River expedition, where he faced a Sioux Indian skirmish led by Sitting Bull, Red Cloud and Crazy Horse at the Battle of Pryor's Creek, Montana. He also served as a captain in the Confederate Army Corps of Engineers under Generals Tilghman and Beauregard; captured at the battle of Fort Henry, early in the Civil War in 1862, he was paroled at Aiken, South Carolina, in November 1862 to serve the rest of the war, including the Richmond–Petersburg Campaign. In the latter part of his life, he worked locating branch railroads such as the Pennsylvania railroad in Maryland and for the Western Maryland railroad.

== Early life and career ==
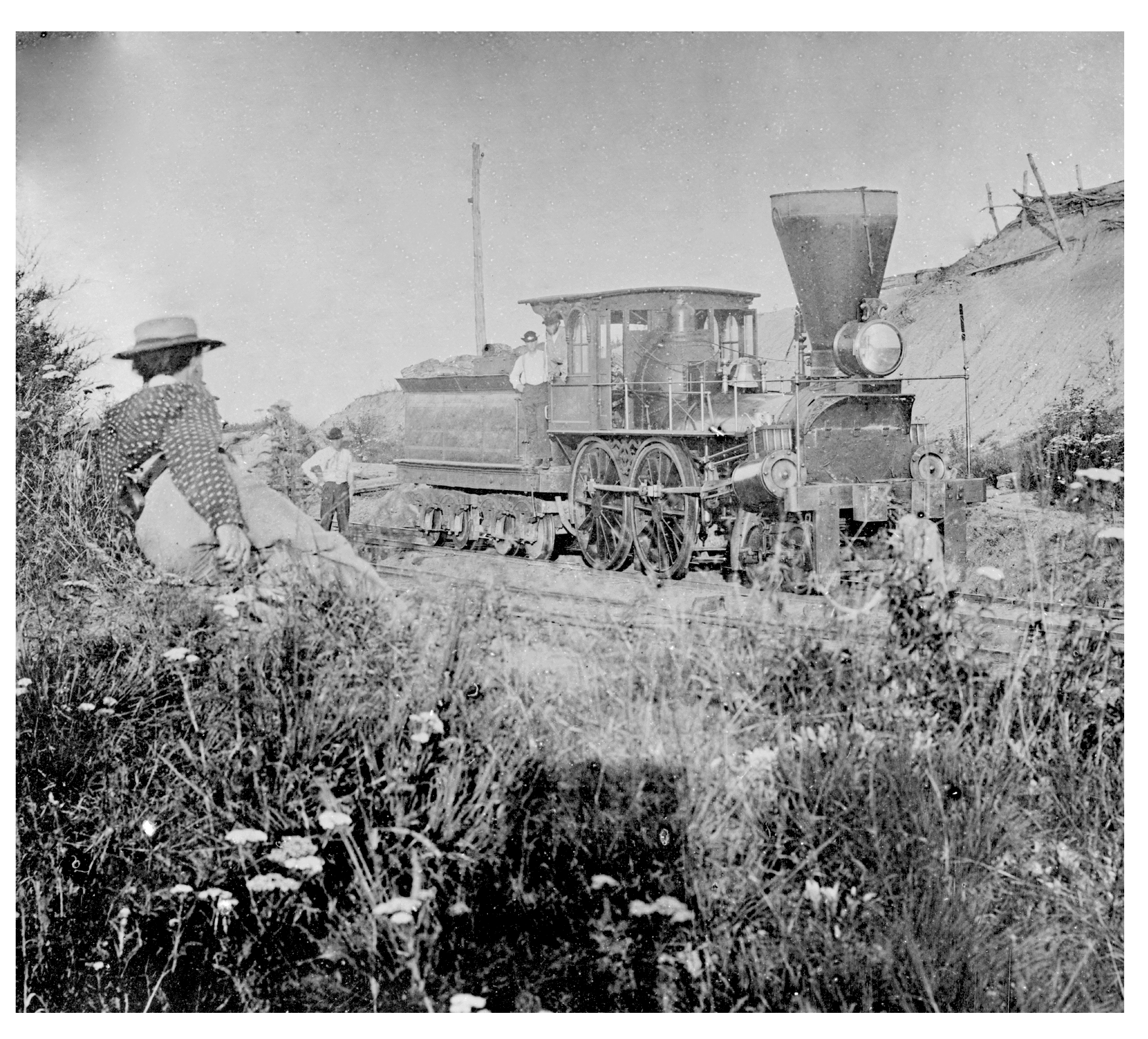
1861 Orange and Alexandria railroad locomotive

Haydon was born on June 21, 1830, in Alexandria, Virginia. Little is known of his education and early career. He married Alice M McSherry (1851-1927) on May 30, 1872, in Baltimore, Maryland. They had six children of which only five survived, three of which were Gertrude (b1876), Alice (b1883) and John (b1886).

=== Baltimore and Ohio Railroad ===
In 1850, Haydon was part of the Baltimore and Ohio Railroad's engineering corps working on the railroad's extension west of Cumberland, Maryland.

=== Orange and Alexandria Railroad ===
In 1852, Haydon worked as a resident engineer on the construction of the Orange and Alexandria Railroad middle section and Warrenton, Virginia.

=== Louisville and Nashville railroad ===
In 1854, Haydon was again a resident engineer, in this case, the fifth division of the Louisville and Nashville railroad from the Tennessee state line to Nashville. This work, the Chief engineer wrote in its annual report consisted of "some of the heaviest work in Tennessee, consisting of two tunnels, and a succession of deep rock cuts, and high embankments." Haydon's work in this division was done in conjunction with the Edgefield and Kentucky railroad. The road was finished into Nashville in November 1859.

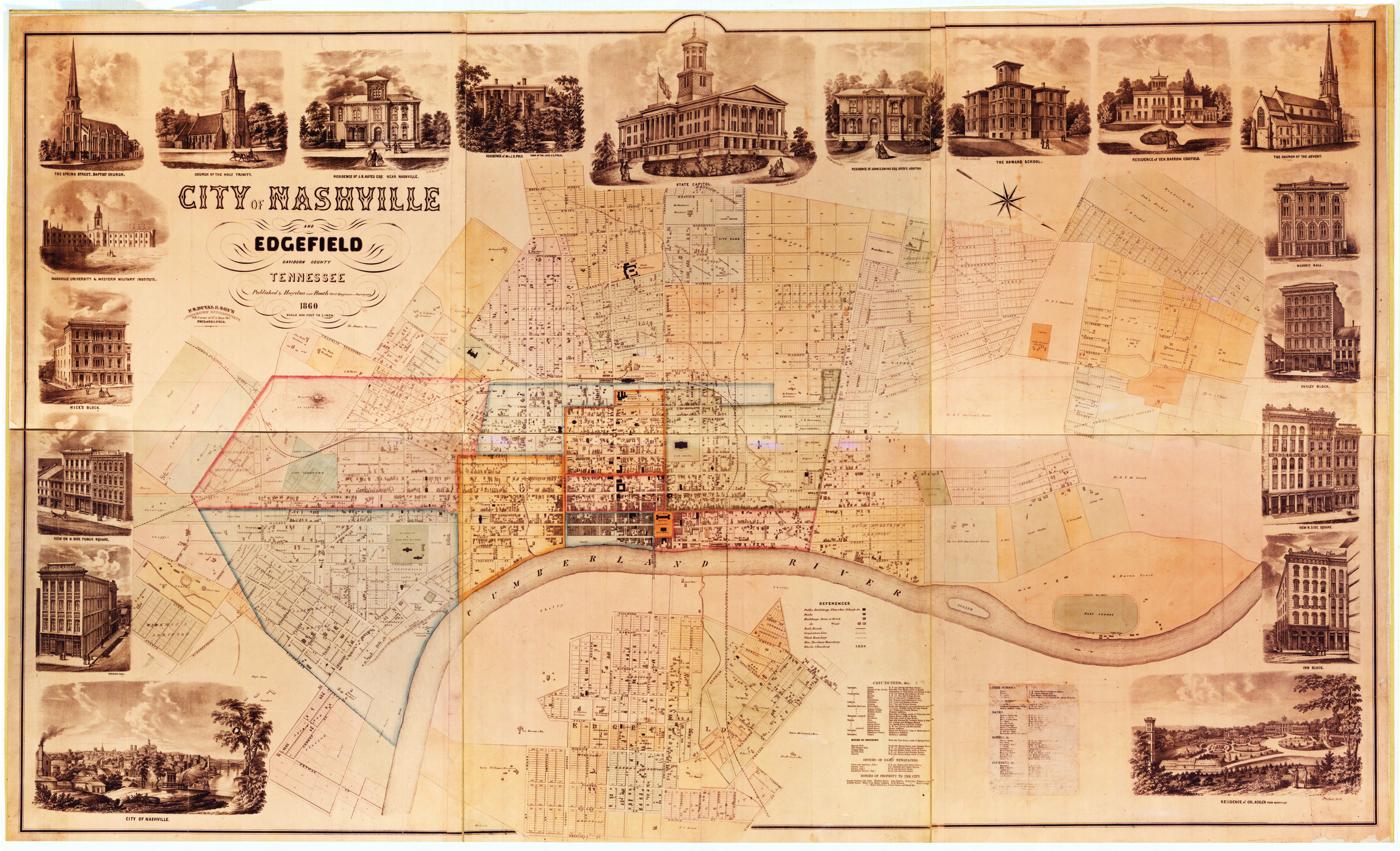
City Engineer Haydon's map of Nashville in 1860

=== Nashville, Tennessee - City Engineer ===
Haydon lived in Nashville, Tennessee, in 1860, during this period as the civil engineer for the city of Nashville, Tennessee.

== American Civil War service ==
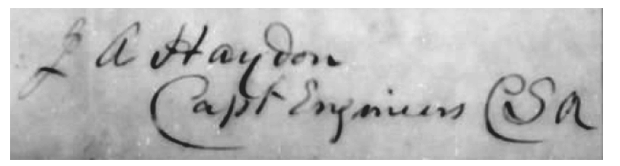
Captain Haydon's signature on a pay voucher from his enlistment

In 1861 with the outbreak of the American Civil War, Haydon was appointed by Tennessee Governor Isham Green Harris in August 1861 as a captain in the Provisional Army of Tennessee as part of the Provisional Army of the Confederate States (PACS).

=== Battle of Fort Henry and Fort Donelson ===
Haydon was assigned to Fort Henry under the command of General Lloyd Tilghman, another railroad engineer. With the first arrival of trained engineers in September 1861, his assignment was to assist Lt. Joseph Dixon acting as the engineering officer, in the oversight of the construction of its works. The work had been going slow due to a number of factors such as manpower and material shortages, losses to disease as well as soldiers refusing to work alongside slaves from Alabama plantations. On October 15, 1861, Major Jeremy Francis Gilmer who would later become famous for his defense of Atlanta, Georgia replaced Lt. Dixon and led the construction efforts at the fort. In February 1862, when Major Gilmer evacuated the fort, Haydon was the senior engineering officer. They left behind a gory mess. Writing after the battle, capture and release of paroled prisoners, a number of officers commented on Haydon's role in the defense of the fort. Colonel Milton Haynes, Army of Tennessee Corps of Artillery inspected Fort Henry the night before its surrender conducted with "Captain Haydon of the Engineers"; he then reported to General Tilghman that the fort was untenable and ought to be abandoned. Colonel Adolphus Heiman of Army of Tennessee commended Haydon as one of a cadre of Confederate officers (including Major J. F. Gilmer and Captain Miller fellow engineers) who deserved particular credit for their management of the fort's guns.

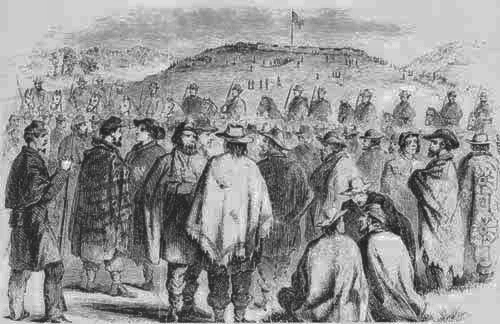
Group of Confederate prisoners captured at Fort Donelson, 1862

Captain John Haydon, 44th Division Engineers, was captured with the surrender of Fort Henry and sent to Johnson's Island in Ohio, at that time, a prisoner-of-war camp for Confederate officers, the only Union prison camp exclusively for Southern officers. Haydon observed that "...at last, we shall hear no more of Kentucky, Virginia and Missouri only, suffering from the absolute distress of actual conflict" Later, Haydon would write that "the war will have reached every southern state both in the seaboard region and exposed river regions."

Haydon was paroled for the first time in November 1862 at Aiken, South Carolina

=== Engineer Bureau of the Confederate States ===
Following his parole in late 1862, Haydon reported to Col. Walter Stevens in the Department of Richmond and worked on rebuilding the Pocahontas bridge over the Appomattox River near Petersburg, Virginia as well as performing reconnaissance on the Potomac river near Point of Rocks, Maryland. The following year in 1863, he was reporting to Col. Alfred L. Rives, acting chief of the Engineer Bureau of the Confederate States. Later, he was again reporting to General Tilghman and supported the removal of four miles of railroad iron from the Rogersville branch of the East Tennessee and Virginia Railroad as part of the East Tennessee Campaign. The next year in 1864, Haydon reported to Colonel Gilmer, Engineers in the defense of Charleston (South Carolina) harbor.

=== Aftermath ===
In April 1865, Haydon was serving with the 25th Engineer corps in Alston, South Carolina when he was paroled a second time as part of General Johnson's Army's surrender in North Carolina on April 26, 1865.

== Postbellum activities ==
Haydon became chief engineer for the Edisto and Ashley Rivers canal company in South Carolina in 1866 as part of a scheme to provide the city of Charleston with a fresh water supply. During this same period, Haydon also served as chief engineer for the Greenville and Columbia Railroad company.

=== Frederick and Pennsylvania Line Railroad ===
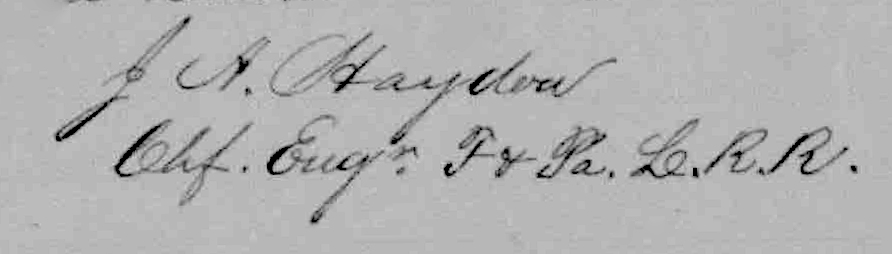
Chief Engineer Haydon's signature from 1869

In 1868, Haydon became chief engineer of the Frederick and Pennsylvania Line Railroad in Frederick, Maryland. Haydon completed construction of the railroad in June, 1872.

=== Northern Pacific Railway ===
As of summer 1871, the railroad had only surveyed its route from Duluth, Minnesota westward to Bismarck, North Dakota. On the Western leg, the railroad had been located from Tacoma, Washington east to Bozeman, Montana. This left chief engineer William Milnor Roberts with the task of locating over 600 miles of railroad in Western Dakota and Eastern Montana what was known at that time as the "middle division" of the Northern Pacific. Roberts planned surveys that included crossing the Bitterroot Mountain passes into Missoula, Montana, as well as a Yellowstone River survey. Robert's plan was for this last survey to start at Fort Ellis, a United States Army fort, east of present-day Bozeman, Montana, cross over Bozeman Pass and follow the Yellowstone River downstream. Roberts chose Edward D. Muhlenberg to head up this 1871 railroad survey party for the Yellowstone River portion. Muhlenberg ran into numerous difficulties executing the plan and producing maps. In November 1871, Roberts joined the effort and reached Muhlenberg's camp on November 8, 1871. Roberts continued the survey to the edge of the Lakota hunting grounds near Pompey's pillar on November 11, returning to fort Ellis on November 20, 1871. Muhlenberg, however, didn't return until November 28, where the military escort under Captain Edward Ball reported 57 soldiers injured by freezing weather. The same winter storm trapped 65 men in another army unit, the 7th infantry, resulting in 22 amputations.

The following year, 1872, Roberts was not able to start recruiting for the 1872 Western survey until June. Haydon had just completed the construction of the Frederick and Pennsylvania Line Railroad and was hired by Roberts. On July 23, 1872, Haydon led the railroad survey party from Fort Ellis, a United States Army fort, east of present-day Bozeman, Montana, consisting of Haydon, chief of party, two principal assistants, in charge of the compass and level, together with rodmen, chainmen, and others (altogether 20 men). Haydon supply train consisted of almost seventy wagons with rations for 105 days and a small herd of beef cattle. Haydon's military escort, commanded by Major Eugene Baker, Second Cavalry, consisting of four companies, 187 men, of the Second Cavalry, and four companies, 189 men, of the Seventh Infantry.

Haydon's mission was to follow the Yellowstone River downstream to the mouth of Powder River a distance of 310 miles. Haydon to meet up with another survey party coming in from Fort Rice in North Dakota on the Missouri River, a distance of over 240 miles to Powder river. Haydon was to return from the Powder via the Musselshell River following this river to its source.

The survey party and military escort proceeded without the benefit of Crow Indian scouts, largely due to rumors of a Sioux-Cheyenne attack or preparations for multiple river crossings with ferry boats. Given these difficulties, Haydon had progressed only 155 miles from Fort Ellis, he was still short 125 miles of his destination of the Powder and had not yet gone beyond where Muhlenberg had finished the year before.

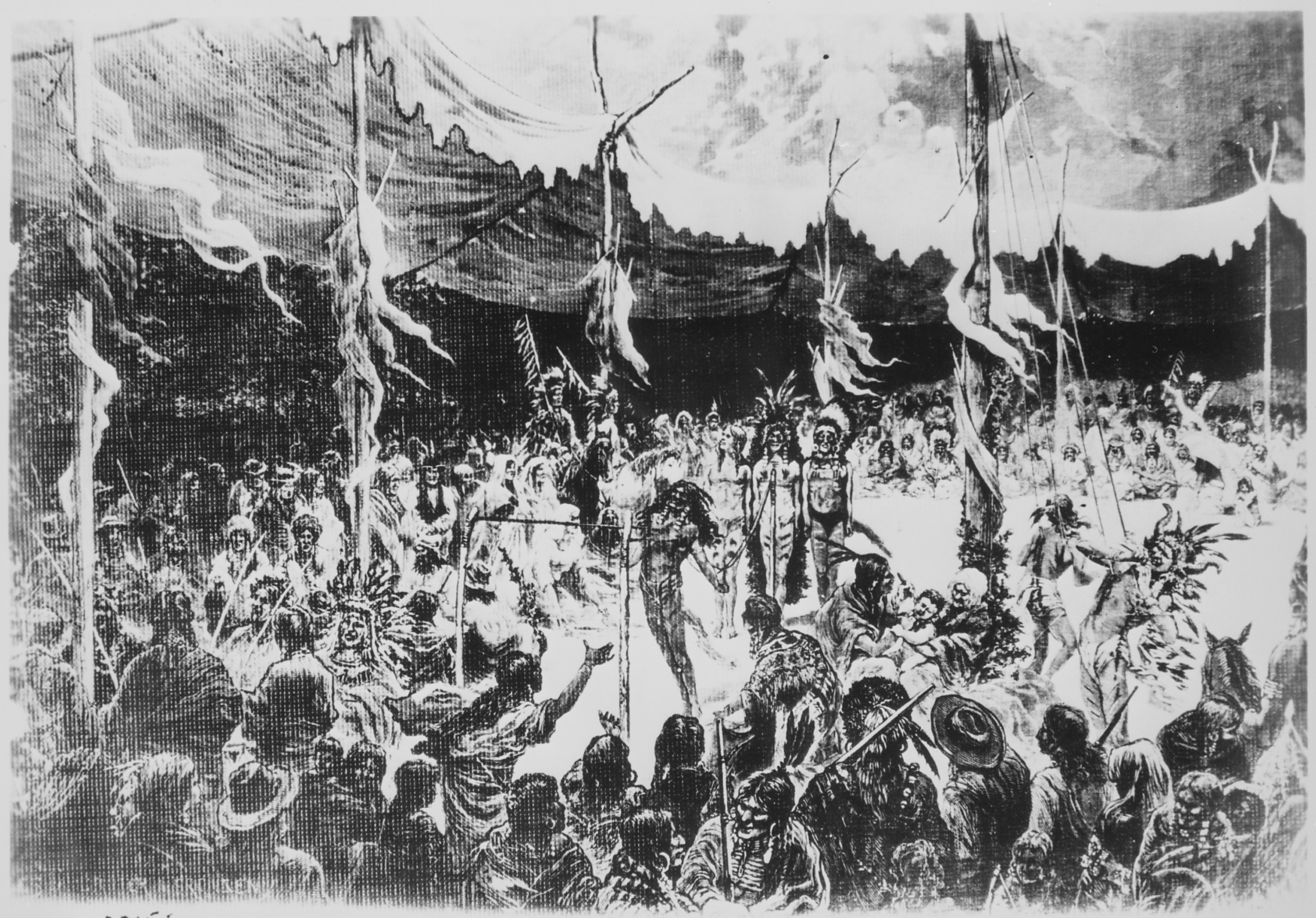
Sioux Sun dance, 1874

==== Battle of Pryor's Creek, Montana ====
On August 13, there were as many as two thousand lodges of Lakotas, Cheyennes, Arapahos and Kiowas gathered on the Powder River under Sitting Bull, Red Cloud and Crazy horse. After performing an annual sun dance ceremony, a war party was formed with as many as a thousand warriors to go upstream on the Powder to locate and fight their enemy, the Crows. The peace treaty of Fort Laramie of 1868 was still in effect, but Sitting Bull found himself just miles from hundreds of horses and cattle and the railroad surveyors led by John Haydon. Sitting Bull attacked in the early hours of August 14, 1872, but by mid-morning the attack was over. During the battle, Sitting Bull, in a personal show of bravery, took four others with him to within two hundred yards of Baker's forces and sat down with pipe and tobacco. He was untouched by any of the soldiers' shots. In similar manner, Crazy Horse mounted a pony and rode in front of the soldiers only to have his horse shot out from underneath of him. By eight o'clock in the morning, the battle was over. No one in Haydon's party was hurt, and that afternoon Haydon's party surveyed another three miles. Haydon, as a Confederate officer who fought and then had to surrender in an untenable military battle (the battle of Fort Henry, Tennessee, February 6, 1862) realized that his party was probably outnumbered by the Sioux and Cheyenne and led by an individual with a questionable military command ability. Although they continued on until August 18, at time, Haydon, exhausted and apprehensive about the safety of the survey party from raids as well as knowing his work with the railroad was ended, requested Baker to return to Fort Ellis. Sitting Bull's defeat had become a strategic victory. For the Northern Pacific railroad, it was a "...stinging, unmitigated defeat, more damaging than any other event to date." (NPR Asst. Superintendent R. A. Crofton, 1873 letter cited in Lubetkin.)

The pattern repeated itself in the Yellowstone Expedition of 1873, resulting in the battles of Honsinger Bluff and Pease Bottom. Full-scale war might have come to the northern plains in 1873 had the Northern Pacific railroad surveys been successful.

Haydon patent depicting stock car feeding device

==== Return to Fort Ellis ====
On August 20, 1872, Haydon's party left the Yellowstone River to march towards the Musselshell River as planned by Chief Engineer Roberts. Haydon became ill on the trip and was temporarily replaced by Lt. Edward John McClernand, who studied surveying at West Point. With Haydon resuming as party chief, the surveyors reached the south fork, 20 miles west of Harlowton, Montana, on September 15. Over the next two weeks, marching through snow and bitter cold, Haydon's party crossed over the pass separating the Mussellshell from the Missouri River by way of Sixteen Mile Creek. On September 26, Baker left Haydon, who went on to the NPR's offices in Helena, thus ending the 1872 Yellowstone expedition and survey.

Unlike the other 1872 NPR survey party leader, Thomas Rosser, who was also a former Confederate officer and fellow engineer under General Beauregard, Haydon didn't have Rosser's experience in cavalry raids or efficiency in handling combat troops. Baker, unlike the other military escort commanders, Ball, Whistler and Stanley, moved his camp only once after the August 14 skirmish. Baker's refusal to furnish more than one company of soldiers to support Haydon in the face of a large Sioux force forced Haydon to turn back. Shortly after Baker returned to Fort Ellis, General Hancock placed him under arrest.

=== Pennsylvania Railroad in Maryland ===
In 1873, the Baltimore and Ohio railroad had purchased a majority of the Consolidation Coal company's stock, thereby controlling coal exports out of the Georges creek valley near Cumberland, Maryland, principally the Maryland Coal Company and the American Coal Company, and effectively the "entire output of coal in (the state of Maryland)." Cumberland interests formed the Pennsylvania railroad in Maryland to escape that control. In January 1878, the railroad engaged Haydon to be its Chief Engineer and started construction the next year in May 1879. The road commenced passenger service to Washington and New York on December 15, 1879. The Pennsylvania railroad with access to the Georges creek valley could then transport Maryland Coal and American Coal companies' "soft coal" products to one of the three export piers the railroad controlled in South Amboy, New Jersey.

=== Central Railway Company of Baltimore Maryland (1880) ===
The Central Railway Company was formed as a competitor to the Baltimore City Passenger Company. In 1880, along with Abraham Patterson, William Graves, George Grafflin and Baltimore real estate developer John T. Ford, Haydon petitioned the city council for permission to lay streetcar tracks from boundary avenue to the Western Maryland's station on Fulton street thence over Howard street, thence to Camden and connections with the Baltimore and Ohio railroad and then to the Light street wharf.

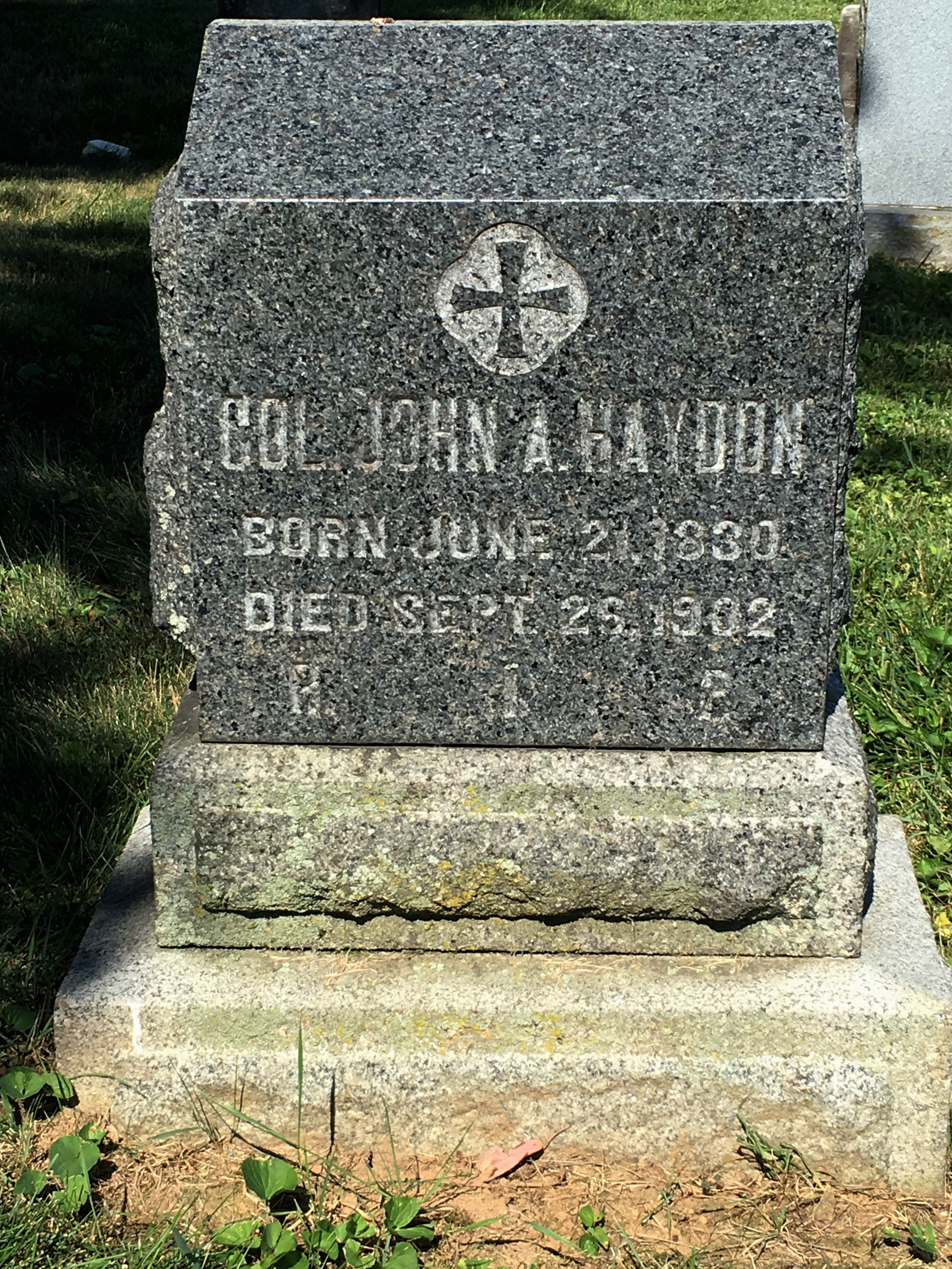
John Haydon Headstone in Saint John's cemetery in Frederick Maryland.

=== Patents ===
Haydon received two patents for his work:

- Patent No. 241,359 in 1881 for a stock car feeding device.
- Patent No. 185,795 in 1876 for a roadway pavement consisting of a stone substratum, formed by slabs set into the road-bed at an angle, an intermediate layer, of concrete and a top dressing.

=== Death ===
Haydon died in Frederick, Maryland, on September 26, 1902, and is interred in St. John's cemetery in Frederick, Maryland.
