= Anthony Rey =

French academic & chaplain (1807–1847)

Anthony Rey, S.J. (born at Lyon, France, 19 March 1807; died near Ceralvo, Mexico, 19 January 1847) was a French Jesuit academic, and U.S. Army chaplain during the Mexican–American War. He was the first Catholic chaplain killed during service with the United States military.

== Life ==
Anthony Rey was born in Lyon, France on 19 March 1807. He studied at the Jesuit college of Fribourg, entered the novitiate, 12 November 1827, and subsequently taught at Fribourg. In 1840 he was sent to the United States, appointed professor of philosophy in Georgetown College, and in 1843 transferred to St. Joseph's Church in Philadelphia, Pennsylvania. Fluent in French and German, Father Rey was able to preach in English three months after arriving in the United States. He became assistant to the Jesuit provincial of Maryland, pastor of Trinity Church, Georgetown, and vice-president of the college (1845).

Appointed a chaplain in the U.S. Army in May 1846, he ministered to the wounded and dying at the siege of Monterrey; after the capture of the city, he remained with the army at Monterrey and learned Spanish in order to preach to the rancheros of the neighbourhood. Against the advice of the U.S. officers, he set out for Matamoros, preaching to a congregation of Americans and Mexicans at Ceralvo. It is conjectured that he was killed by a band under the leader Antonio Canales Rosillo, as his body was discovered, pierced with lances, a few days later.

== Works ==
He left letters dating from November 1846, which were published as Woodstock Letters (XVII, 149-50, 152-55, 157-59).

== See also ==
- Roman Catholic Archdiocese for the Military Services, USA
