= L'Hermitage Slave Village Archeological Site =

- U.S. National Register of Historic Places
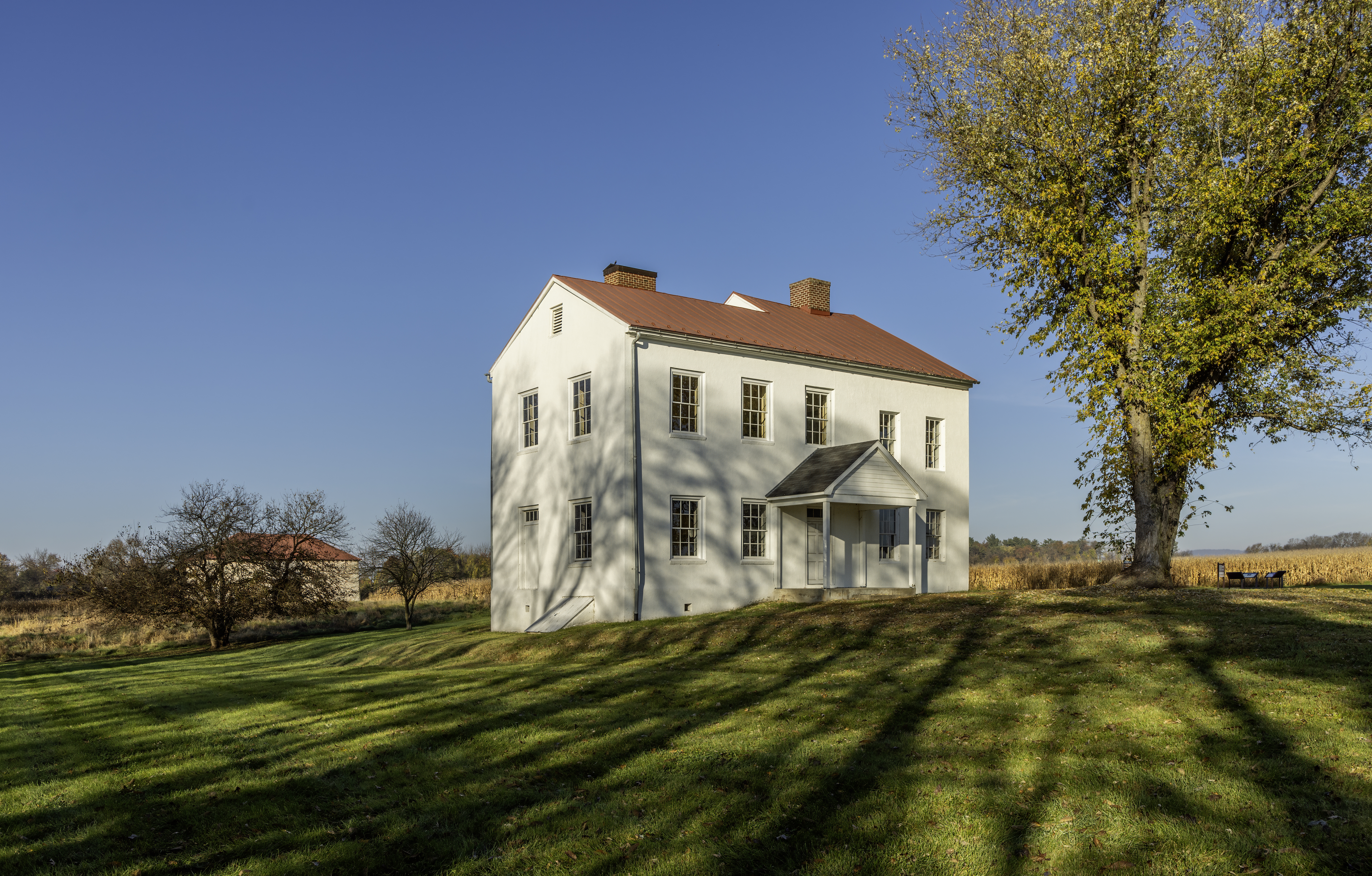
- L'Hermitage Plantation-Best Farm main house, with the barn behind

- Location within Maryland Location within the United States
- Location: 4801 Urbana Pike, Frederick, Maryland
- Coordinates: 39°22′13.174″N 77°23′55″W
- Area: 1.4 acres (0.57 ha)
- NRHP reference No.: 07001450
- Added to NRHP: January 29, 2008

L'Hermitage Slave Village Archeological Site is an archaeological site near Frederick in Frederick County, Maryland. The location, within the boundaries of Monocacy National Battlefield, was the site of l'Hermitage Plantation, founded about 1793 by the Vincendière family. The Vincendières are believed to have been former Haitian landowners who had fled the Haitian Revolution to the Catholic-leaning state of Maryland. L'Hermitage was notable during its time for its size, brutality and for the large number of slaves on the property.

The site was the subject of an archaeological excavation by the National Park Service in the summer of 2010 which focused on the structures on the site, believed to have been slave cabins. The Park Service had acquired the area in 1993 as part of an expansion of the battlefield site, and conducted preliminary investigations in 2003. The location became known as the Best Farm, and many of its structures remain extant as part of the battlefield's landscape.

== L'Hermitage Plantation ==
The Vincendière family was initially headed by Marguerite Magnan de la Vincendière, some of her children, and a relative, Jean Payen de Boisneuf. Marguerite's husband, Etienne Bellumeau de la Vincendière, did not come to Maryland, choosing instead to establish himself in Charleston, South Carolina. Twelve slaves accompanied the Vincendières. Marguerite and Etienne's daughter Victoire, aged 17 in 1793, was responsible for assembling the lands of the plantation between 1793 and 1798 and became head of the family by 1800. By 1800 there were ninety slaves on the property, which encompassed 748 acres (303 ha) at its peak. The plantation was notable for its size and ethnic character; more typical landholdings in the area were much smaller, with no more than a dozen slaves, and were owned by German immigrant farmers. The slave population at l'Hermitage was the second largest in Frederick County, and one of the largest in Maryland. The Vincendière family may have been trying to re-create the large-scale slave labor system that they were familiar with in Haiti, possibly in order to cultivate labor-intensive crops. The Vincindières built many of the structures still visible at the site.

== Slavery ==
L'Hermitage was also known in its time for its harsh regime. Julian Ursyn Niemcewicz traveled through the area in June 1798, recounting that he had been told of tyranny and torture at the plantation:

June 15. ... Four miles from the town [of Frederick] we forded the river [Monocacy]. On its banks one can see a row of wooden houses and one stone house with the upper storeys painted white [the secondary house]. ... One can see on the home farm instruments of torture, stocks, wooden horses, whips, etc. Two or three negroes crippled with torture have brought legal action ...

Nine court proceedings against family members for cruelty to slaves are recorded, including proceedings against Boisneuf for "cruelly and immercifully beating and whipping" six slaves and against Victoire Vincendière for beating her slave Jenny. These charges were dismissed, but Payen de Boisneuf was found guilty in 1797 of beating a slave named Shadrack and of "not sufficiently clothing and feeding his negroes."

The Vincendières sold L'Hermitage in 1827, after gradually dispersing most of their slaves. Victoire moved to a townhouse in Frederick. Victoire died in 1854, still the owner of three slaves. Her will stipulated their freedom. Slavery at the property continued under the new proprietors. John Brien (or O'Brien) bought the farm and continued the practice, and David Best, the farm's tenant from 1843, kept slaves. Best had six slaves in 1860, making him one of the largest slave owners in the county. Slavery ended in Maryland in 1864.

The L'Hermitage site was listed on the National Register of Historic Places in 2007.

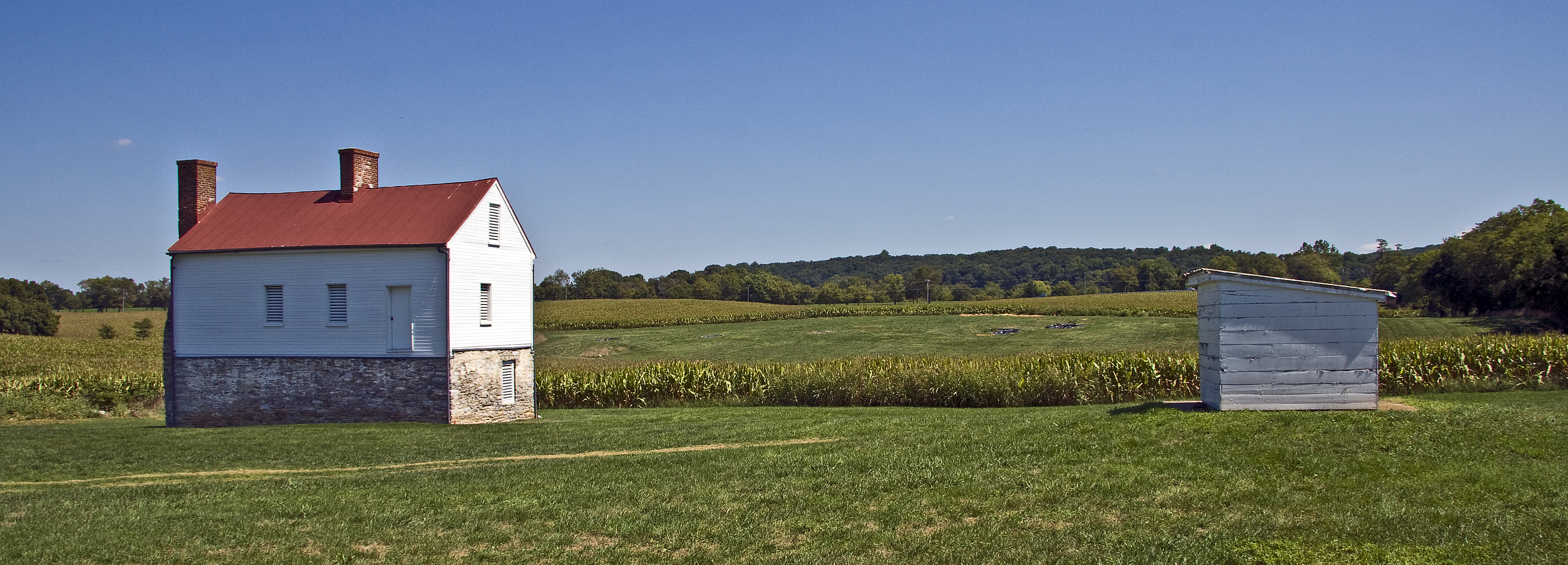
The slave quarters were located in the un-planted field beyond the buildings. The building at left is believed to be the "stone house with upper storeys painted white."
