= Fishers Hill, Virginia =

- CDP
- Location within Virginia Location within the United States
- Coordinates: 38°58′58″N 78°24′36″W
- Country: United States
- State: Virginia
- County: Shenandoah
- Elevation: 689 ft (210 m)
- Time zone: UTC-5 (Eastern (EST))
  - Summer (DST): UTC-4 (EDT)
- ZIP code: 22626
- Area code: 540
- GNIS feature ID: 2830685

Fishers Hill is a CDP in Shenandoah County, Virginia, United States. Fishers Hill is 2.1 miles (3.4 km) west of Strasburg. Fishers Hill has a post office with ZIP code 22626, which opened on July 28, 1882.

Today it may best be known for the 1864 Battle of Fisher's Hill, a Confederate defeat among the Valley campaigns of 1864, among those which led to the removal of CSA General Jubal Early as well as to the burning of many recently harvested crops in the area by Union forces (the re-created Army of the Shenandoah (Union)) led by General Philip Sheridan. Decades later, until the 1930s, Fisher's Hill was also the site of many summertime reunions of both Confederate and Union veterans, as well as picnics for the area's Germanic families (the latter of which continue through the Hottel Keller), who could readily reach the picnic grounds after disembarking from the railroad at Strasburg. In the 1880s, two distinguished women landscape painters (Bertha Von Hillern and Maria J. C. a' Becket), and writer Emma Howard Wight lived in Fishers Hill. The Snapp House was listed on the National Register of Historic Places in 1979 as exemplifying the architecture of the area's settlers from Germany.
