= Barbizon (disambiguation) =

Barbizon is a commune in the Seine-et-Marne department in north-central France.

Barbizon may also refer to:

== Art ==
- Barbizon school of painters in France, c. 1830–70
- American Barbizon school of painters in the US, late 19th century

== Business ==
- Barbizon Hotel for Women, New York City

== Education ==
- Barbizon Modeling and Acting School

== Entertainment and media ==
- The Temptation of Barbizon, a French fantasy-romance film from 1946, directed by Jean Stelli
