= Koen van den Broek =

Belgian artist (born 1973)

Koen van den Broek (born 1973) is a Belgian artist who lives and works in Antwerp and Seoul, South Korea.

== Biography ==
Van den Broek was born in 1973 in Bree, Belgium.

He trained as an architect at the Katholieke Universiteit Leuven. At the Academy, Koen was tutored and taught by Fred Bervoets. In 2003 he participated in the SFMOMA- exhibition "Matisse and beyond: A century of modernism" in honor of his mentor.

Van den Broek was acquainted with John Baldessari when he went to Los Angeles, not long after his stay at the post-graduate program of the HISK (Higher Institute for Fine Arts) in Antwerp in 2001. They decided in 2008 to collaborate on a project that combined photographs by Baldessari with painted interventions by van den Broek. "I worked with photographs Baldessari made of film-stills of Hollywood-movies (…) Baldessari printed them on large format, three by four metres (…) John sent me images that are the opposite of my work: black and white, lots of interiors, while I work with colour and exteriors. (…) he sets up pitfalls for an artist, because I definitely didn't want to do what he should do: it was a tricky process, but also a very intriguing one."

When he was asked by the Museum of Modern Art, Antwerp in 2008 to curate an exhibition with their collection, he combined it with work from Belgian private collections. He created connections between Minimalist and Post-expressionist art styles."

On the occasion of his solo-exhibitions at the Municipal Museum for Contemporary Art (Stedelijk Museum voor Actuele Kunst, SMAK) in Ghent, "Crack", a comprehensive catalogue, was published, edited by Wouter Davidts, and with contributions by, among others John Welchman, Andrew Renton and Dirk Lauwaert. In this monography, as well as in the exhibition a broad overview was given of van den Broek's career uptil that point, and this helped him to draw "…new conclusions from my older work and this gave me the energy to keep on developing my familiar motives of the urban landscape and how this can be translated in new ways onto the canvas."

== Work ==
The work of van den Broek is characterized thematically by the way in which it treats the (mainly American and Asian) landscape, starting more and more from an abstract language.

Van den Broek is mainly concerned with the image and the structure of the image itself, and much less with the handling of paint or bringing over a message.

In "The blinding of photography" Dirk Lauwaert points out that: "… in every image, the painter [van den Broek] marks out his place with razor-sharp precision". The reason is his photographic point of departure, the world as seen through one lens. Van den Broek's main question here is: how to translate the photographic eye into an image. "The photograph is in fact less than a sketch. It is something that is wholly and completely inadequate: it is not an image, at best only a registration. It is not a material that can be worked –such as a drawing that is homologous to a painting. The photograph must disappear as a photograph in order for an image to exist."

This use of photography has consequences for the composition. In contrast to human interpretation, which tries to structure what is important and what is not, the mechanical device blurs this difference. By his cadrage he always seems to leave out the most important part.

Therefore, his paintings often show seemingly unimportant details or object-matter like kerb-stones, garages, shadows or cracks in a road-surface. Their subject however, according to art historian David Anfam, seems to be something else: "… the hoary modernist process of abstracting from observation has gone awry. … these fields and angles are semaphores, as non-objective as Newman's or Piet Mondrian's, in search of a subject. Here schemata seek or feign to become site-specific places."

Van den Broek often uses saturated and high-key colours. In his work, space is made by its borders and demarcations, and light is evoked with shadow, without midtones. This often lends to his work a graphic character, with pure colours.

Recently, in a series of new exhibitions (Chicane at Marlborough Contemporary London, Yaw at Galerie Greta Meert Brussels, Apex at Friedman Benda Gallery New York, Zylon at Gallery Baton in Seoul, Armco at Figge von Rosen Galerie in Cologne and Cut Away The Snoopy at Marlborough Contemporary in London) this graphic character has been carried further, into a direction that seems to move away from its basis in reality. To do this, Van den Broek samples parts of existing images freely into a new image. More and more attention is given now to the picture-plane itself, on which architectural details and shadows become pictorial elements that create new constellations.

== Exhibitions (selection) ==
- 2023: "The Coin Toss", de Boer gallery, Los Angeles, United States
- 2022: "Firminy", Chambre Avec Vue, Saignon, France
- 2022: "Warm Comfort", De Buck, Saint-Paul-de-Vence, France
- 2021: "Tango in Paris", Philipp von Rosen Galerie, Cologne, Germany
- 2021: "Through Romance", curated by Luk Lambrecht, Lempertz, Brussels
- 2021: "In Between Memory and Dream", Gallery Baton, Seoul, South-Korea
- 2020: "The Beginning", Galerie Ron Mandos, Amsterdam, Netherlands
- 2019: "Wall Works", CCM De Garage, Mechelen, Belgium
- 2019: "Keep it Together", Galerie Greta Meert, Brussels, Belgium
- 2019: "The Dog", Philipp von Rosen Galerie, Cologne, Germany
- 2018: "A Glowing Day", Gallery Baton, Seoul, South-Korea
- 2016: "Behind The Camera", Philipp von Rose Galerie, Cologne, Germany
- 2016: "Borderline", Campaign Opera and Ballet Flanders 2016-2017, Antwerp Tower, Antwerp, Belgium
- 2016: "The Land of Milk & Money", Museum Weserburg, Bremen, Germany
- 2016: "The Light We Live In", Albertz Benda, New York, United States of America
- 2016: "In Dialogue With Jan Cox", Duo exhibition curated by Koen van den Broek, Callewaert Vanlangendonck Gallery, Antwerp, Belgium
- 2015: "Sign Waves", Gallery Baton, Seoul, South Korea
- 2015: "The Del", Galerie Greta Meert, Brussel, Belg
- 2014: "Cut Away The Snoopy", Marlborough Contemporary, London, United Kingdom
- 2014: "Armco", Figge von Rosen Galerie, Cologne, Germany
- 2013: "Zylon", Gallery Baton, Seoul, South Korea
- 2013: "Yaw", Galerie Greta Meert, Brussels, Belgium
- 2013: "Apex", Friedman Benda, New York, United States
- 2012: "Chicane", Marlborough Contemporary, London, United Kingdom
- 2012: "From The East to the West And Back", Gallery Baton, Seoul, South Korea
- 2011: "Insomnia and the Greenhouse", Friedman Benda, New York, United States of America
- 2011: "Comin' Down", Figge von Rosen Galerie, Berlin, Germany
- 2010: "What?" Greta Meert, Brussels, Belgium
- 2010: "JOURNEY", Figge von Rosen Galerie, Cologne, Germany
- 2010: "Curbs & Crack", S.M.A.K., Ghent, Belgium
- 2010: "Preview, Work on Paper by Koen van den Broek", Royal Museum of Fine Arts Antwerp, Antwerp, Belgium
- 2009: "Shadows of time" Black Polyurethane on inox, MDD, Deurle, Belgium
- 2008: "THIS AN EXAMPLE OF THAT", Collaboration with John Baldessari, Greta Meert Gallery, Brussels, Belgium
- 2008: "THIS AN EXAMPLE OF THAT", Collaboration with John Baldessari, Bonnefantenmuseum, Maastricht, Netherlands
- 2008: "Out of Space", Figge von Rosen, Cologne, Germany
- 2008: "Who will lead us?" artbrussels, (winner of the illy Prize), Brussels, Belgium
- 2007: "Angle", Inside the White Cube, London, United Kingdom
- 2006: "Dante's View", Figge von Rosen Gallery, Cologne, Germany
- 2006: "Project St Lucas Ghent", Vlaamse Bouwmeester, Ghent, Belgium
- 2005: "Paintings from the USA and Japan", Museum Dhondt-Dhaenens, Deurle, Belgium
- 2004: "Koen van den Broek", Domus Artium, Salamanca, Spain
- 2004: "Framed: Koen van den Broek – Wim Catrysse", Cultuur Centrum Strombeek, Brussels, Belgium
- 2003: "Threshold", White Cube, London, United Kingdom
- 2003: "Matisse and Beyond: A Century of Modernism, San Francisco Museum of Modern Art, United States of America
- 2002: "Koen van den Broek", Chapelle des Pénitents Blancs, Gordes, France
- 2001: "Borders", White Cube, London, United Kingdom
- 2001: "Koen van den Broek: Paintings", Museum van het Provinciaal Centrum voor Beeldende Kunst-Begijnhof, Hasselt, Belgium
- 2000: Cultureel Centrum Hasselt, Belgium
- 1999: Galerij Art 61, Hever, Belgium
- 1998: Bernarduscentrum, Antwerp, Belgium
- 1997: Galerij Hellinga Beetsterzwaag, Netherlands

== Public collections ==
- Astrup Fearnley Museum of Modern Art, Oslo
- Busan Museum of Art, Busan
- Kadist Art Foundation, Paris
- LACMA, Los Angeles, CA
- Leeum, Samsung Museum of Modern Art, Seoul
- M HKA, Antwerpen
- Museum Dhondt-Dhaenens, Deurle
- Museum Voorlinden, Wassenaar
- S.M.A.K, Gent
- San Francisco Museum of Modern Art
- Staatliche Kunsthalle Karlsruhe, Karlsruhe

== Bibliography ==
- Koen van den Broek: Stuff, Wouter Davidts, Frank Albers, ed. Exh. Cat. De Garage Mechelen, MER. Borgerhoff & Lamberigts, 2019, ISBN 9789089319975
- BALDESSARI John, VAN DEN BROEK Koen, This an example of that. John Baldessari – Koen van den Broek, bkSM, Strombeek, 2008 ISBN 978-90-76979-72-4
- DAVIDTS Wouter (ed.), Crack. Koen van den Broek, Valiz, Amsterdam, 2010 ISBN 978 90 7808841 7
- Friedman Benda (ed.), Koen van den Broek. Insomnia and the greenhouse, Hatje Kantz Verlag, Ostfildern, 2013 ISBN 978-3-7757-3478-3
- NICOLETTA Giovanna, Shadows, MAG Musea Alto Garda, Arco, 2012 ISBN 9788866860211
- HIGGIE Jennifer, Koen van den Broek, White Cube, London, 2003 ISBN 0-9546501-0-7
- ROELSTRATE Dieter, Angle, 11 works by Koen van den Broek, White Cube, London, 2007
- VAN DEN BROEK Koen, Schilderijen/paintings, De bestendige deputatie van de provincieraad van Limburg, Hasselt, 2001 ISBN 90-74605-13-3
