= St. John the Evangelist Catholic Church (Frederick, Maryland) =

Catholic church in Frederick, Maryland

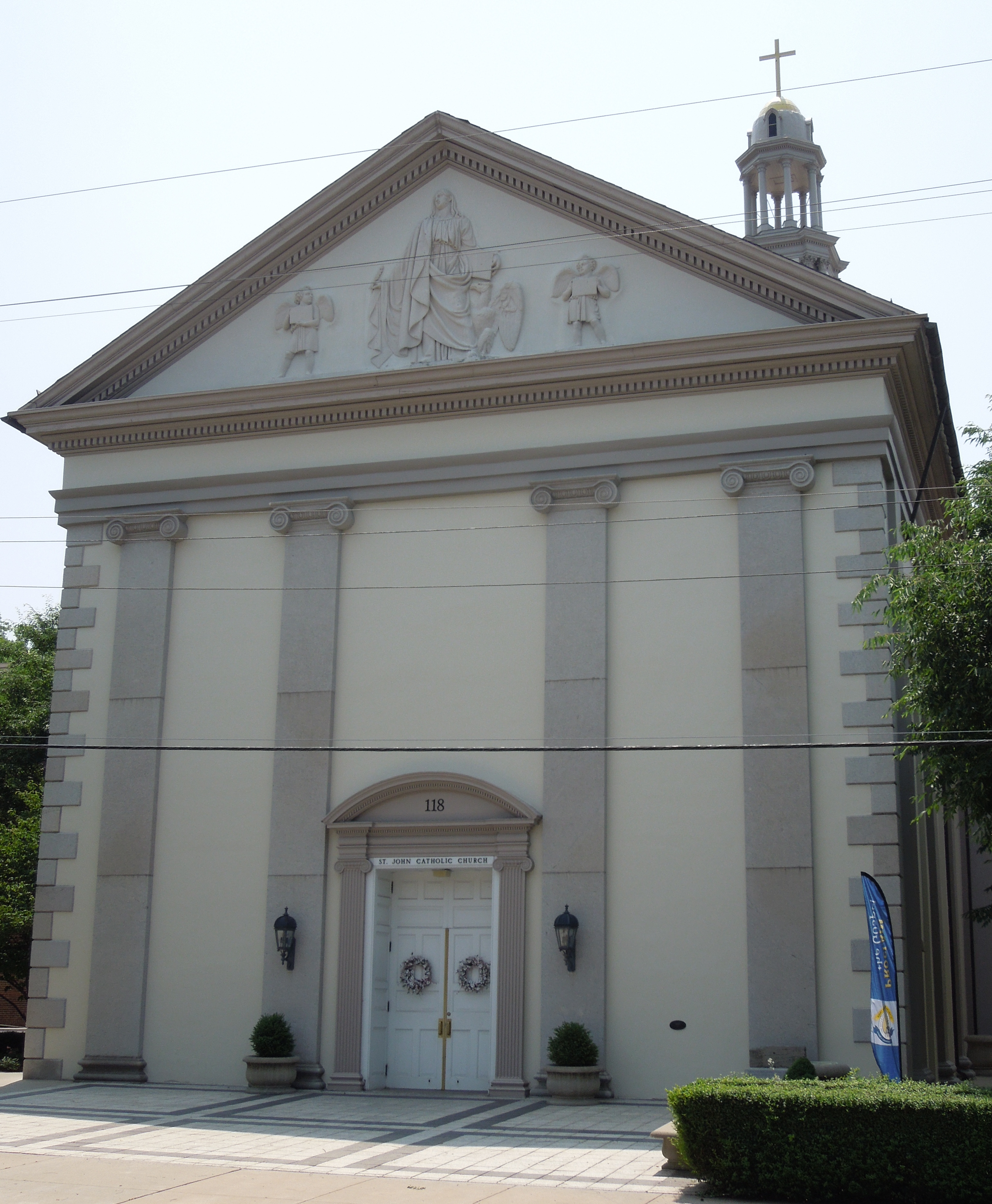
- East Second Street façade
- St. John the Evangelist Catholic Church
- 39°24′58″N 77°24′27″W
- Location: Frederick, Maryland
- Denomination: Catholic Church
- Website: stjohn-frederick.org

History
- Status: Parish church
- Founded: 1763
- Dedication: Saint John the Evangelist
- Consecrated: April 26, 1837

Architecture
- Style: Greek Revival
- Groundbreaking: 1833
- Completed: 1837

Specifications
- Length: 104 feet (32 m)
- Width: 94 feet (29 m)

Administration
- Archdiocese: Archdiocese of Baltimore
- Frederick Historic District
- U.S. Historic district – Contributing property
- Part of: Frederick Historic District (ID73000916)
- Designated CP: October 18, 1973

St. John the Evangelist Catholic Church is a parish of the Roman Catholic Church in Frederick, Maryland, part of the Archdiocese of Baltimore. Founded in 1763, after the repeal of the British penal laws, as the first Catholic church in Frederick County, the parish occupied two former buildings before the completion of the present Greek Revival church in 1837. At the time of its opening, the church was the largest parish church in the United States and was the first Catholic church to be consecrated in the Diocese of Baltimore. Today, the church remains the tallest building in the city of Frederick.

== History ==
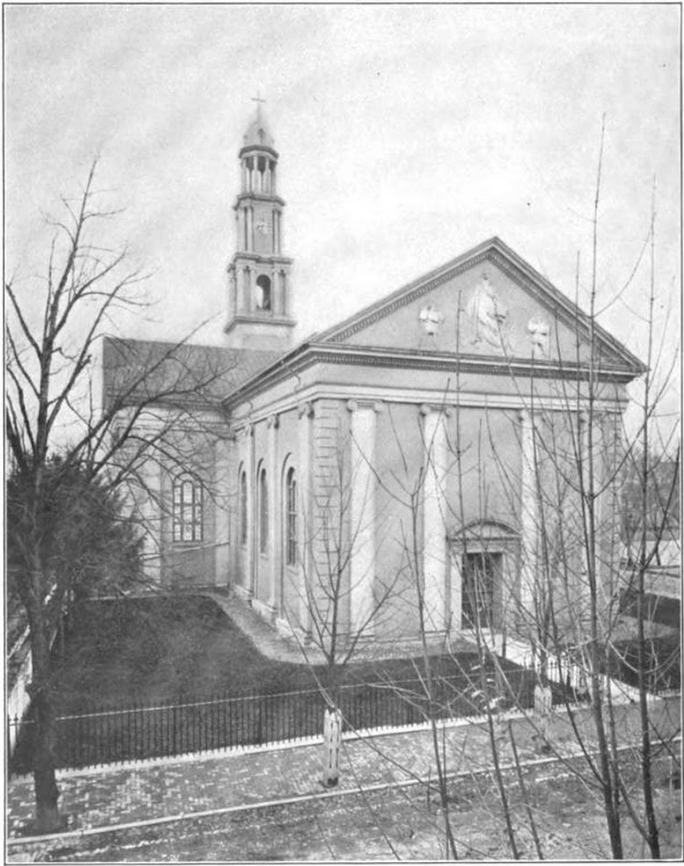
St. John's Church

The first Catholic worship space, set up in 1763, was in a brick house on the north side of Second Street. Though Catholics had been present in the Province of Maryland from its establishment in 1634 by the Lord Baltimore, Cecil Calvert, the British penal laws forbade the open practice of Catholicism. The Jesuits administered the parish until their suppression by the pope in 1773; their involvement in the parish was resumed in 1814. Following the repeal of the Penal Laws in 1776, Pope Pius VI established the Diocese of Baltimore, in whose territory the church laid.

Under the pastorate of Rev. John DuBois, construction on a new building for St. John's Church began, and the cornerstone was laid on May 15, 1800. (This cornerstone was rediscovered in 1904, and sits at the entrance of the church today). DuBois' successor, Rev. John McElroy, S.J. decided to demolish this building and erect a new church. Construction began in 1833, and the completed church was consecrated on April 26, 1837, becoming the first consecrated church in the Archdiocese of Baltimore and the largest parish church in the United States. During the Civil War, the church was converted in its purpose as a jail for captured Confederate soldiers. Jesuit involvement in the church came to an end in 1902, after their novitiate located across the street from St. John's relocated to New York.

The church is located at the intersection of Second Street and Chapel Alley in the Frederick Historic District. It is adjacent to the Visitation Academy of Frederick. It operates the nearby St. John's Cemetery, which was founded in 1845.

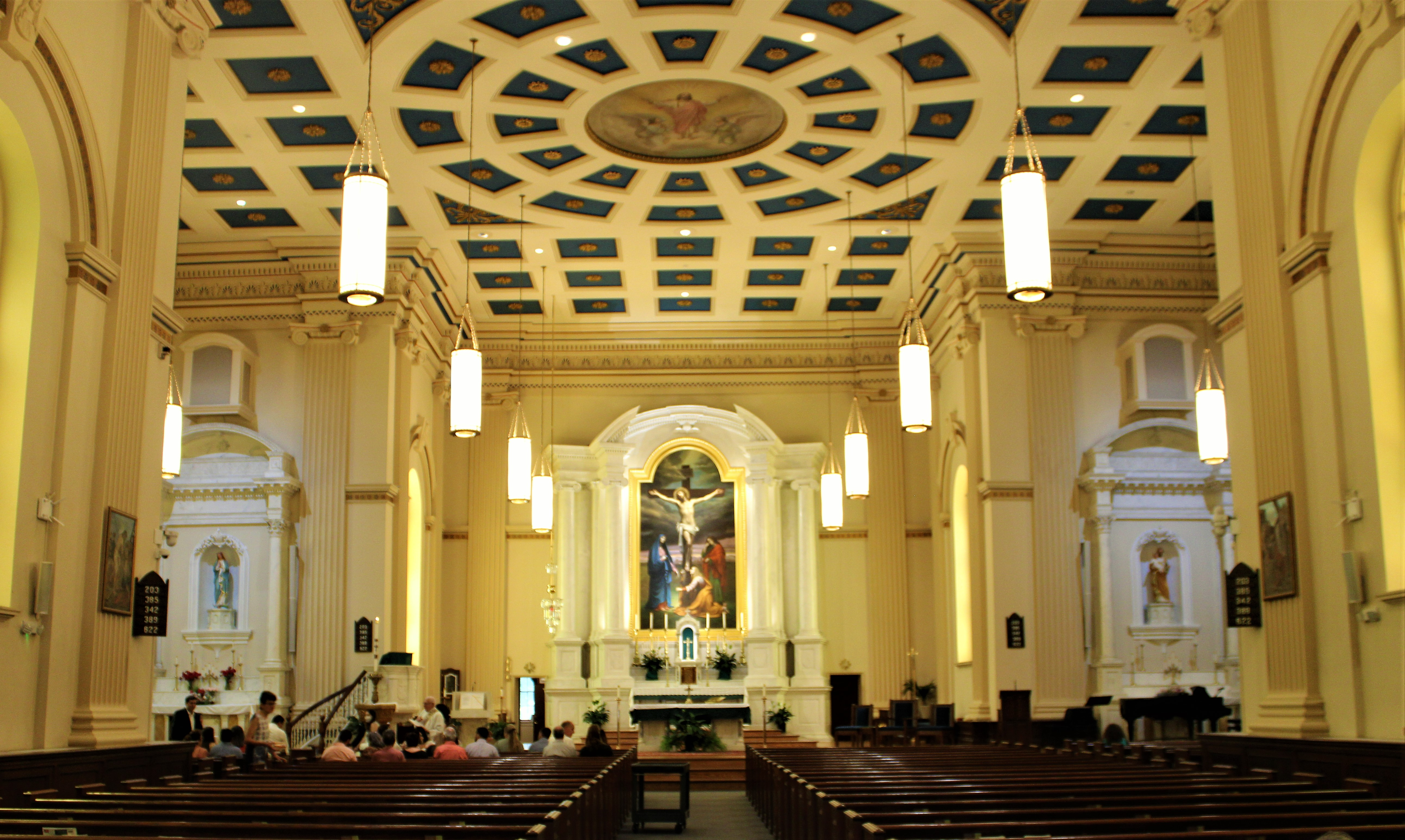
Interior

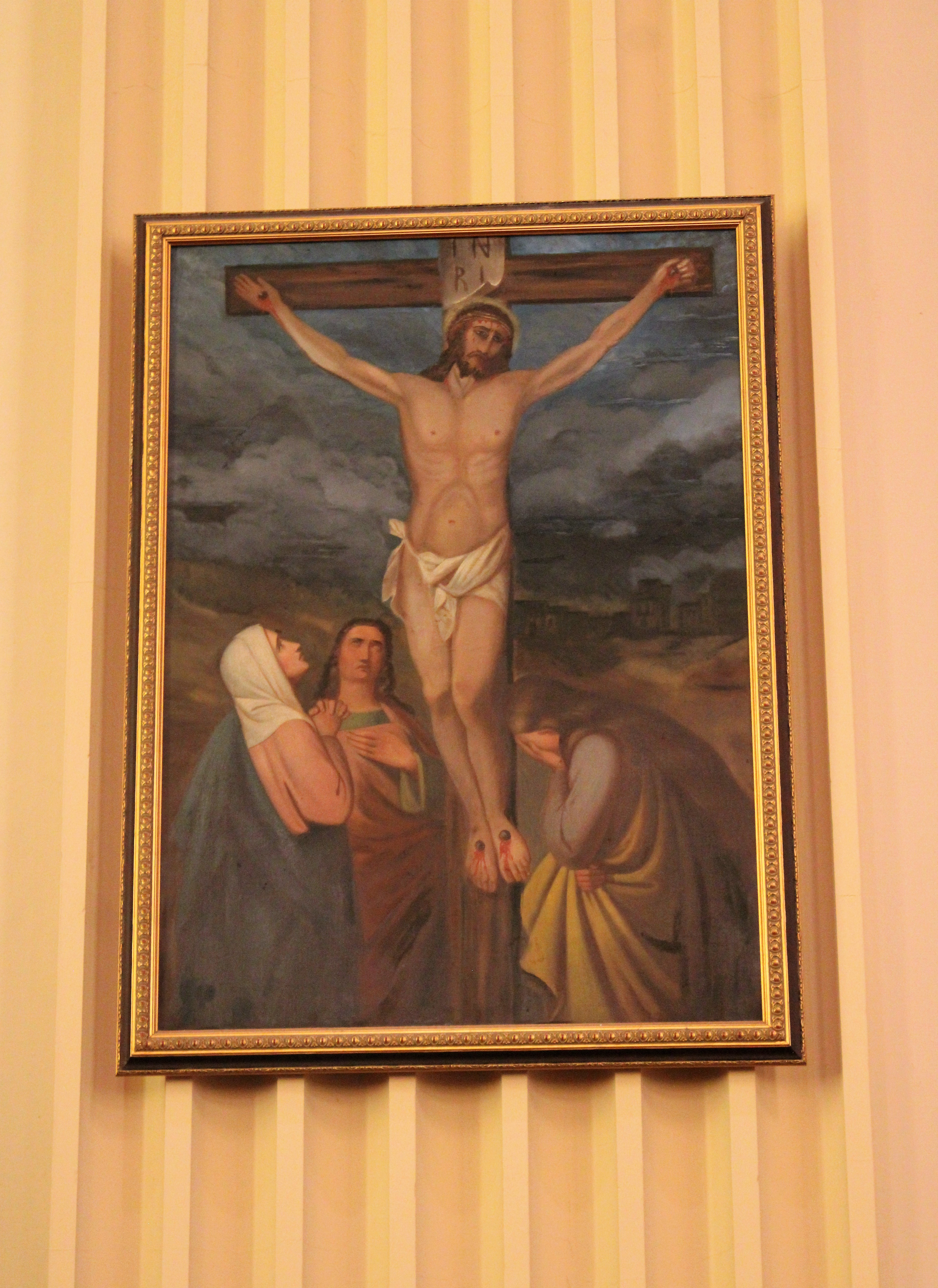
One of the Stations of the Cross

== Architecture ==
The existing church building, completed in 1837, is built in the Greek Revival style. Designed by local architect John Tien, the building's façade features pilasters of the Ionic order. The cruciform floor plan takes the shape of a Latin cross, extending 104 feet (32 m) in length and 94 feet (29 m) in width. The pediment of the façade contains an 11-foot-tall (3.4 m) relief of St. John the Evangelist with his attribute, an eagle, to his left and to his right an angel holding a tablet inscribed with "in principio erat verbum" and "et verbum caro factum est", meaning "in the beginning was the Word...and the Word became flesh."

The church's square bell tower was completed in 1857, consisting of three, one-story telescoping sections and being topped by a gold cupola and a finial cross. Rising 145 feet (44 m), it makes St. John the Evangelist the tallest building in the city of Frederick.

=== Interior ===
In 1912, in celebration of the church's 75th anniversary of its consecration, a painting of the Ascension of Jesus was commissioned by Severino Baraldi in the center of the ceiling. Prior to its painting, the area was occupied by an IHS Christogram, surrounded by six cherubim. The church is also adorned with a painting of the Crucifixion by Pietro Gagliardi, which was added in 1843. The church's high altar is constructed of Egyptian and Italian marble, while each 17-foot (5.2 m) window is peaked with a bust of St. John the Evangelist. In 1845, the Stations of the Cross were donated by Bishop Andrew Byrne of Little Rock to Rev. McElroy.

== See also ==
- St. John's Cemetery, Frederick, Maryland
- Visitation Academy of Frederick
