= Visitation Academy of Frederick =

Catholic girls school in Maryland (1846–2016)

Location
- 200 East 2nd Street; Frederick, Maryland 21701; United States
- 39°24′58″N 77°24′25″W

Information
- Type: Private, All-Girls
- Religious affiliation: Roman Catholic
- Established: September 11, 1846
- Founder: The founders of the Order of the Visitation of Holy Mary are St. Jane de Chantal and St. Francis de Sales
- Closed: June 30, 2016
- School number: (301)-662-2814
- Grades: PreK-3 – 8
- Athletics conference: Maryland Junior Athletic Conference (MJAC)
- Nickname: Vis, FAV (1950s & 60s)
- Team name: Angels
- Website: www.thevisitationacademy.org

The Visitation Academy of Frederick was a private, all-girls, Roman Catholic school located in the Frederick Historic District in Frederick, Frederick County, Maryland. It is located in the Roman Catholic Archdiocese of Baltimore.

== History ==
=== Beginnings ===
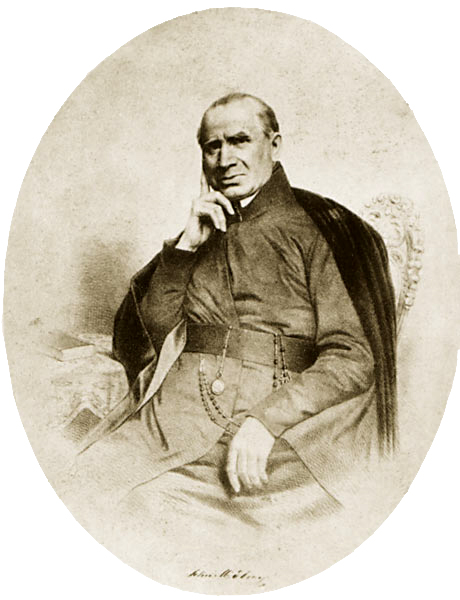
John McElroy

In 1823 Father John McElroy began negotiations with the Sisters of Charity for the establishment of a school for girls in Frederick, Maryland. In 1824, the St. John's Benevolent Female Free School was founded by the Sisters of Charity of Saint Joseph at 200 East Second Street, Frederick, Maryland. The Sisters ran the school for 22 years until they withdrew from Frederick in order to join the congregation of the Sisters of Charity of Saint Joseph at Emmitsburg, Maryland. Before departing, it was arranged that Visitation Sisters from Georgetown, in Washington D.C., would take control of the school. On September 11, 1846 eleven Visitation Sisters arrived in Frederick, Maryland and founded the Visitation Academy.

=== Civil War ===
The Visitation Academy was not untouched by the American Civil War. During the period leading up to the start of the war, many students were recalled to their homes. Throughout the war no single event had a more lasting effect on the Visitation Academy than the Battle of Antietam. In the hours and days that followed the battle fought on September 17, 1862, casualties were moved from Sharpsburg to Frederick, Maryland. The number of casualties quickly overwhelmed the single hospital, and 19 other buildings including the Visitation Academy, were quickly converted into 'Asylums for the sick'. This unfortunate event saw the return of the Sisters of Charity, from Emmitsburg, Maryland, who arrived to help nurse the wounded. During the chaos, daily instruction continued for the 60 remaining students.

=== Campus ===
RearView Frederick Academy of the Visitation

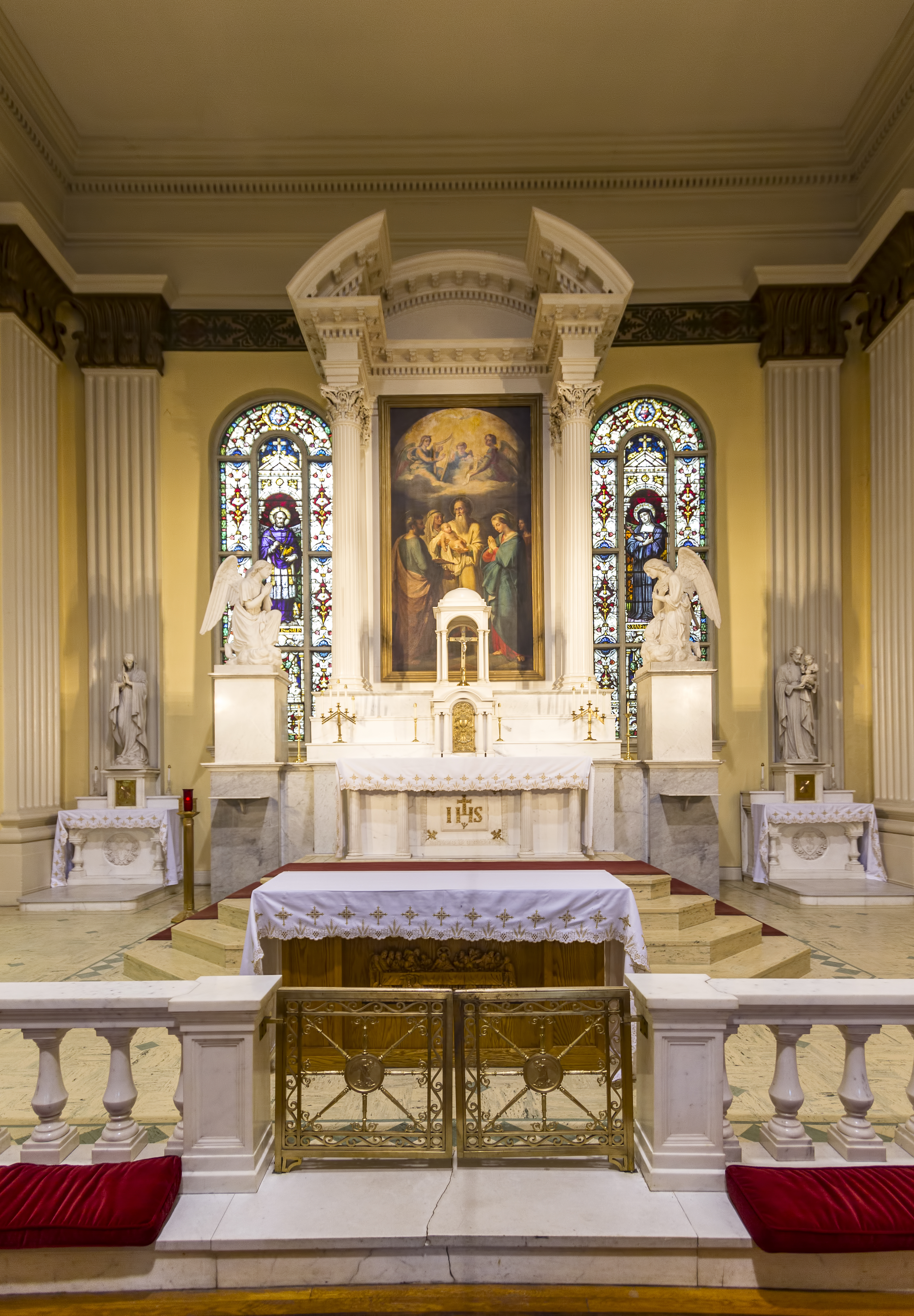
Visitation Academy Chapel

When established in 1846, the Visitation Academy consisted of a large three-story building sitting on a 5,580 square foot plot of land. The sisters purchased an additional 3 acres surrounding the original building in order to expand the school and construct an official monastery with cloistered gardens.

- 1847 Expansion – Due to a rapid increase in attendance, the south wing was added to the existing building.
- 1851 Expansion - An east wing was added to the main building. The east wing housed a chapel and the monastery proper.
- 1860 Expansion – A Hall was added to the south wing.

==== The Chapel ====
Added in the 1851 expansion, the Corinthian style chapel physically separates the monastery from the school. The main altar is constructed of marble and an oil painting depicting "The Presentation in the Temple" is hung above the altar. Two stained glass windows created by Franz Mayer & Co. of Munich, Germany frame the altar. The windows depict the founders of the Visitation Order. The left window is an image of St. Francis de Sales and the right window is an image of St. Jane de Chantal.

=== Departure of the Sisters ===
In the spring of 2005 the Visitation Monastery closed its doors as an act delivered from the Vatican. The remaining 3 Visitation Sisters were transferred to the Monastery of the Visitation of Holy Mary Monte Maria in Rockville, Virginia.

=== Boarders ===
When the Sisters of the Visitation arrived at the school in 1846 they found 10 boarders waiting for them. Boarders were housed in a dormitory located in the south wing. In the early years boarders arrived from almost every state in the Union. Towards the end of their existence at the Visitation Academy, they came primarily from Mexico and South America, in many cases attending for only one year to learn English. Boarders were phased out in 2005 with the closing of the Visitation Monastery, since the Sisters would no longer be on-site to care for them after school hours.

=== Academy Ownership ===
In 1846 the property was deeded to the St. John's Institute by the Sisters of Charity, which was then turned over to the Sisters of the Visitation. In 2009, 4 years after the departure of the Sisters of the Visitation from the Visitation Academy, the Academy was sold by the Sisters of the Visitation to a group formally known as the Visitation Academy Inc.

=== Closure ===
The school closed in June 2016. In a letter to parents, the chairman of the school's board of directors cited rising costs of the lay-operated school that "dramatically outpaced what the market is willing to bear," resulting in declined enrollment and unsustainable operations.

=== Redevelopment ===
The site was sold to a developer in 2017 for $2.75 million and suffered a fire in 2023. The site will be redeveloped into condos and a Marriott-affiliated hotel. Designer's renderings show restaurant seating in the nave of the former chapel. The restaurant's bar has replaced the chapel's altar and is overlooked by the original stained glass windows and religious statuary.

== Academics ==
Classes included a traditional curriculum of language arts, math, science, social studies, physical education and geography. The traditional curriculum was enriched with art, music, dance, public speaking, Spanish, computer/technology education (including a STEM center) and life skills. The Visitation was also in an International Baccalaureate candidacy for their middle school years. Religious studies were a core part of the curriculum with students in 4th through 8th grade attending mass daily at St. John the Evangelist Roman Catholic Church, and primary classes attending weekly.

== Extracurricular activities ==
=== Athletics ===
Students in 5th through 8th grade participated in the Maryland Junior Athletic Conference (MJAC) and compete against local middle schools in the area. Sports programs include cross country, volleyball, basketball, soccer and track and field.

=== Band ===
Students in 4th through 8th grade had an opportunity to participate in Band.

== Traditions ==
Visitation Academy Entrance

=== Apple Dumpling Day ===
The Visitation Sisters arrived in 1846 to relieve the Sisters of Charity. The students did not embrace the Sisters upon their arrival and began a hunger strike. The neighbors on East Second Street were sympathetic to the Visitation Sisters and made them dinner. The meal was brought in and shared by the Sisters with the students. Apple dumplings were served for dessert and as the sweet dessert was shared a bond was created between the Sisters and the students. This event was recreated annually until the late 1990s when the Sisters were no longer able to bake apple dumplings due to aging and failing health. Upon the departure of the Sisters from the Visitation Academy in 2005, the girls restarted Apple Dumpling Day in order to pay homage to the Sisters and order of the Visitation. In the final years of the school, the tradition remained strong. All of the Visitation girls took part in Apple Dumpling Day from the pre-kindergarten through 2nd grade students, who harvest the apples off the campus apple tree, to the 3rd through 8th graders who bake the dumplings.

=== Service of Lights ===
The Service of Lights tradition began in the 1950s, and continued as a celebration of the birth of Jesus Christ. The ceremony was performed by 3rd through 8th grade girls in all-white dresses. The program consisted of songs performed by the chorus, bible readings about the birth of Christ and the lighting of candles.

=== Father Daughter Dance ===
This event started after the departure of the Visitation Academy Sisters in 2005. The event played an important role in reinforcing the bond between fathers and daughters.

=== Eighth Grade School Ring Blessing ===
This ceremony was a rite of passage for 8th graders who are leaving the Visitation Academy and heading to high school. The rings are blessed and may be worn as a physical reminder of their careers at the Visitation Academy.

=== Bell and History Days ===
This event marked the start of the museum and historical site season in Frederick County, Maryland. Bells were rung simultaneously throughout the city marking the occasion. The Visitation Academy is included in the bell ringing and also hosts educational events with tours and children's hands-on activities.

=== May Day ===
Believed to have been started in the 1920s, the May Procession (aka, May Crowning) is a celebration of the Blessed Virgin Mary. The girls dressed in all-white dresses perform an hour of songs and prayers. The climax of the celebration was the moment when the May Queen (the student with the longest attendance at the school) places a crown of flowers on the head of a statue of Mary.

=== Mother Daughter Tea ===
This event started after the departure of the Visitation Academy Sisters in 2005. The event played an important role in reinforcing the bonds between Mothers (and Grandmothers) and Daughters.

=== Eighth Grade Graduation Mass and Luncheon ===
This event included mass, awards presentation, diplomas presentation and a luncheon with parents and school faculty.

== Special Events ==
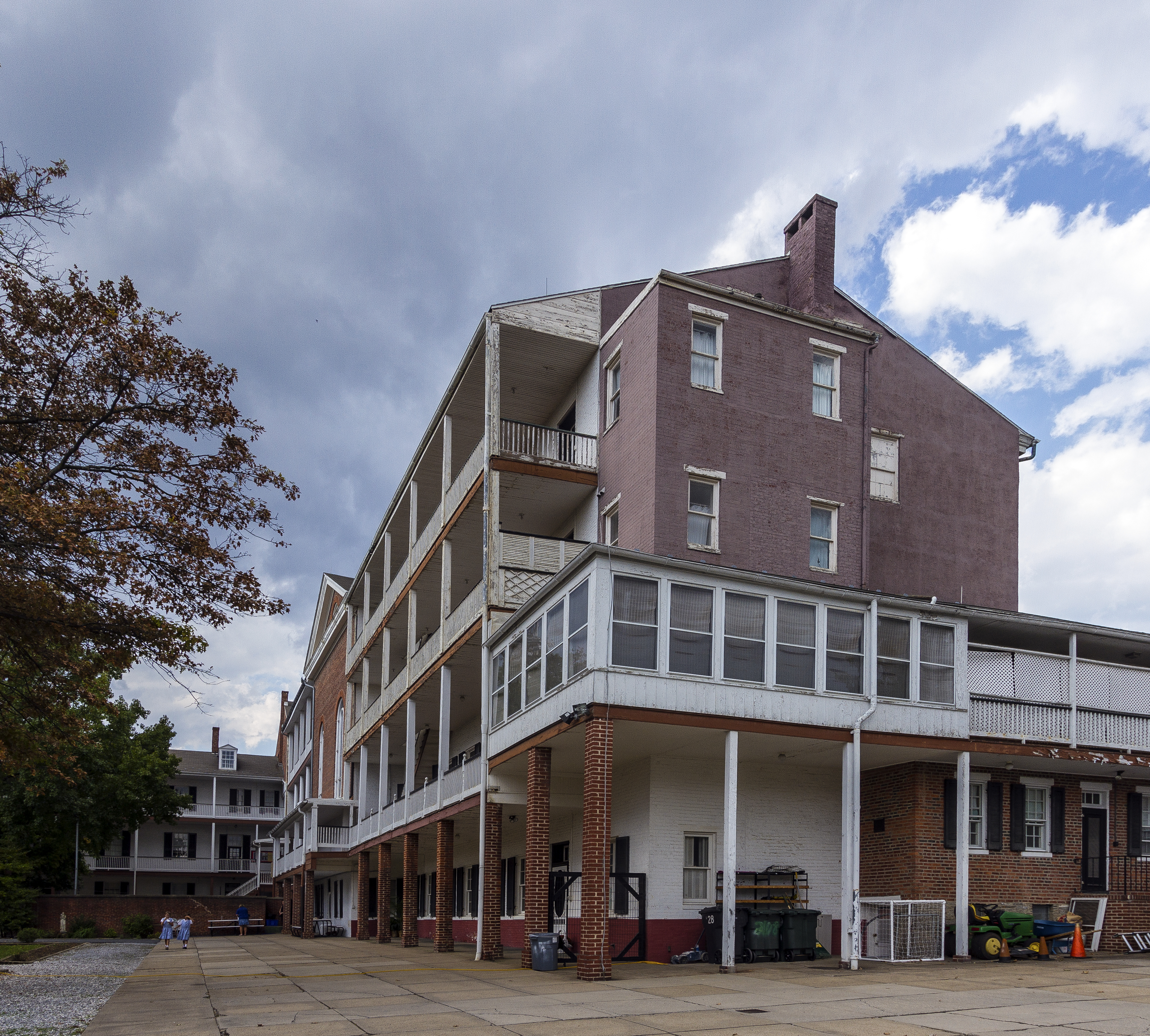
The courtyard during the One Vast Hospital tour

- 2011 Annual Gala - Restaurateur, Top Chef cheftestant, and James Beard award nominee Bryan Voltaggio hosted the 2011 Visitation Academy Annual Gala on August 28, 2011. The Gala was held in the courtyard at the Visitation Academy. Gala Menu
- 2011 Medieval Maidens Festival – A day of learning and hands–on activities for girls ages 6–14. Program included learning about the daily lives of young women during the Medieval. Participants received a book from the "Medieval Maiden" series, signed by author Lois Jarman, who attended the event.
- 2012 One Vast Hospital - An event sponsored by the Frederick Tourism Council and the National Museum of Civil War Medicine that marks the 150th anniversary of the Civil War, and more specifically, the battles of South Mountain and Antietam. This free event spotlights the campus, which had been re-created as 'General Hospital No. 5'. A number of educational exhibits, historical re-enactments and displays contrasting 1862 medicine with 2012 medicine while showing how Civil War medicine influenced modern practices were created for the event. One Vast Hospital

== Notable alumnae ==
- Mary Louise Markell, a charter member of the West Virginia Society (formed in 1900) and the Regent of the Frederick Chapter of the Daughters of the American Revolution from 1906-1909.
- Cynthia Doyle (Craft), a political activist from Maryland.
- Emma Howard Wight (1863–1935), author
