= Dearth =

Dearth means lack, shortage or scarcity. It may also refer to:

== People ==
- Henry Golden Dearth (1864–1919), American painter
- James Dearth (born 1976), retired National Football League long snapper, primarily for the New York Jets, also played for the Cleveland Browns and Tarleton State University Texans
- John Dearth (1920 – 1984), British actor
- 'John Wesley Dearth III,' full name of American rock musician John Wesley (born 1962), American rock musician
- Dearth Voyd, character in the TV show Monkey Magic
