= Henry Golden Dearth =

American painter (1864–1918)

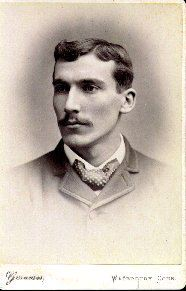
- A photo of Henry Golden Dearth from Mattatuck Museum Arts and History Center
- Born: April 22, 1864; Bristol, Rhode Island, United States
- Died: March 27, 1918 (aged 53); New York City, United States
- Education: École des Beaux-Arts, Paris, France
- Known for: Painting
- Movement: American Barbizon school

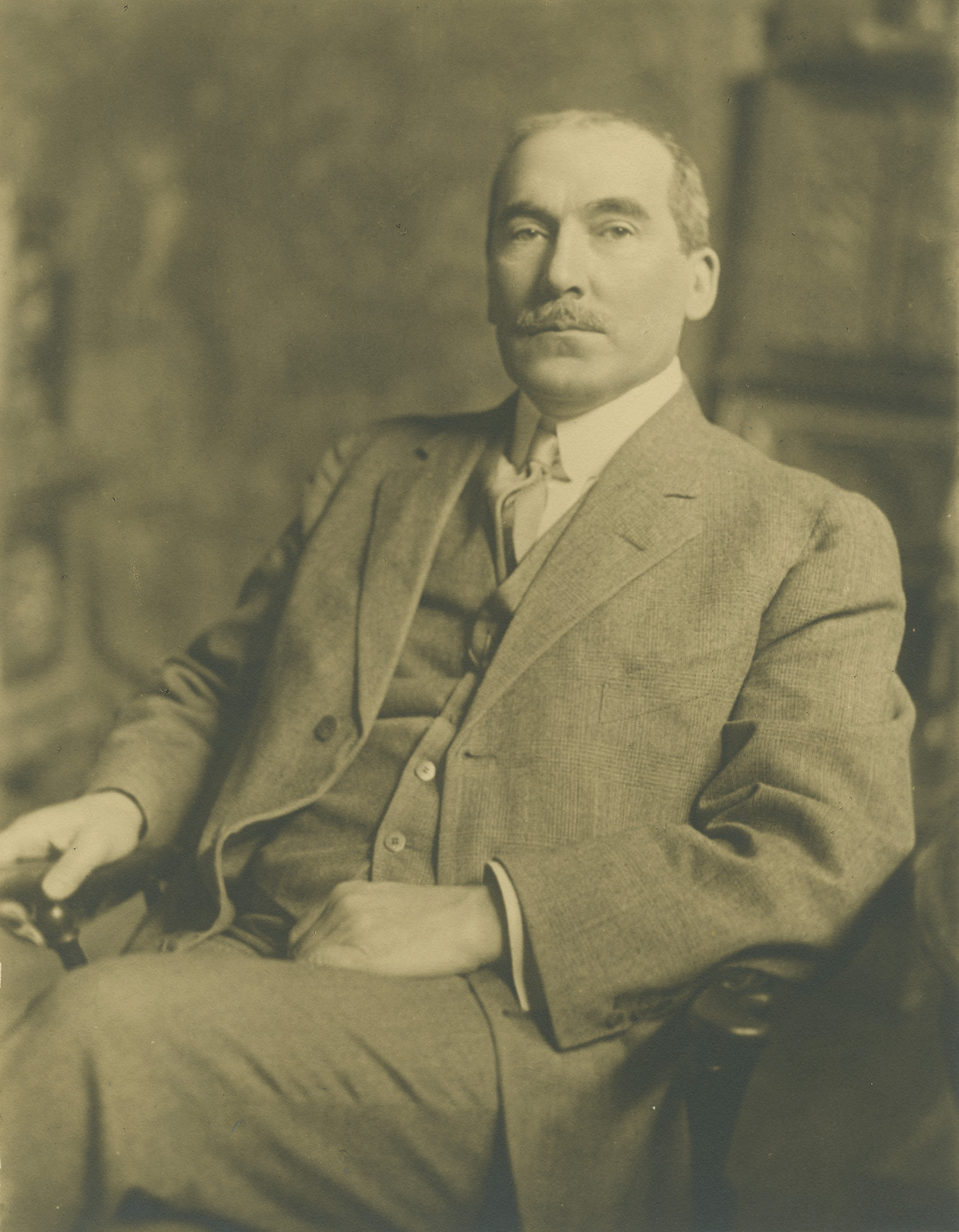
Henry Golden Dearth by James W. Porter, 1912, silver print

Henry Golden Dearth (22 April 1864 – 27 March 1918) was a distinguished American painter who studied in Paris and continued to spend his summers in France painting in the Normandy region. He would return to New York in winter, and became known for his moody paintings of the Long Island area. Around 1912, Dearth changed his artistic style, and began to include portrait and still life pieces as well as his paintings of rock pools created mainly in Brittany. A winner of several career medals and the Webb prize in 1893, Dearth died suddenly in 1918 aged 53 and was survived by a wife and daughter.

== Early life ==
Born on April 22, 1864 in Bristol, Rhode Island, Henry Golden Dearth was the youngest of five children of John Willis and Ruth Marshall Dearth. His father was connected with the whaling business and was an artillery officer during the civil war. He was also a talented musician and provided favorable influences to the development of Henry's talent. His grandfather was a commander in the United States Navy during the War of 1812. At the age of 15, his family moved to Waterbury, Connecticut, where he entered the employ of Brown & Brothers, and was afterward for a time connected with the Waterbury Clock company. Dearth's passionate love for art led him to eventually devote himself solely to the study of painting. He entered the studio of portrait painter Horace Johnson for three months before he went to Paris and studied in the atelier of Ernest Hébert and Aimé Morot at L’Ecole des Beaux Arts.

Returning to the United States in 1888, Dearth established himself with a debut exhibition of landscape at the National Academy of Design. In 1889 he exhibited for the first time with the more progressive Society of American Artists. In 1893 he was awarded the Webb prize for works by an artist under the age of 40. In 1902 he opened his studio at 18 E. 40th Street in New York and started to return to spend his summers in Normandy, the region that first attracted him to landscape painting. He had a house and studio at Montreuil-sur-Mer, in the Pas-de-Calais, on the English Channel coast, where he worked several months each season. He married Cornelia Van Rensselaer Vail, the younger sister of Anna Murray Vail, on 26 February 1896 and they had one daughter Nina Van Rensselaer Dearth.

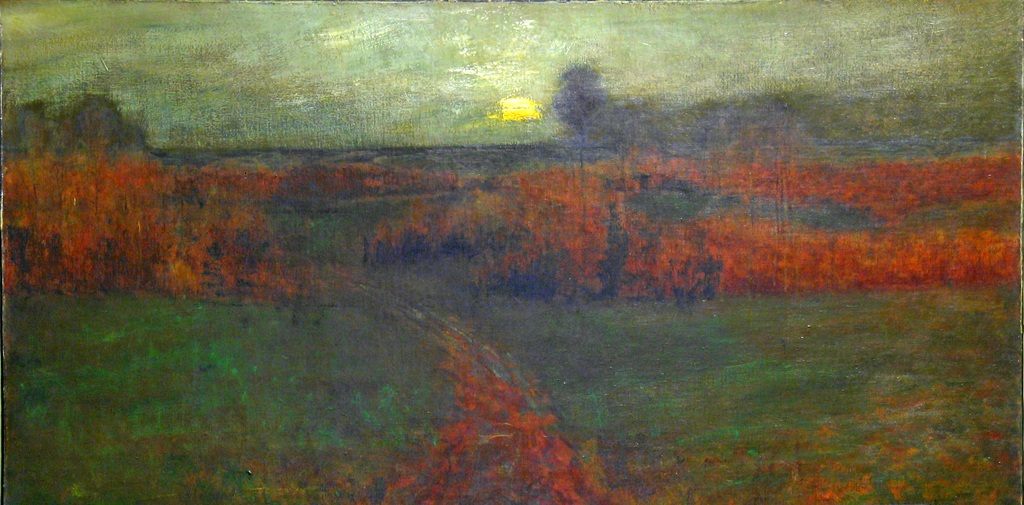
Evening Glow (1889), private collection. An example of Dearth's early tonalist style.

Flecks of Foam (1911/12), National Gallery of Art. One of Dearth's numerous 'rock pool' subjects.

== Careers ==
Dearth's career can be divided into two periods. Before 1912, he was a tonalism painter and is considered part of the American Barbizon school. Spending most of his time in France, he was naturally fond of the picturesque country, and many of his subjects were found near Boulogne and Montreuil-sur-Mer. These early works show a marked indifference to detail, a somewhat limited palette and a preference for a low key. In art critic Charles Buchanan's words, Dearth was more or less repainting Barbizon, but was "inexpressively exquisite" and "a supreme gentleman of aethetics".

After 1912, he altered his technique and painted with broken colors, changing his subjects from the moody landscapes of Long Island and Montreuil to still life and figurative subjects in a style reminiscent of Adolphe Monticelli. Such a style change was marked by his request to the Metropolitan Museum of Art in 1915 to replace his earlier work with his recent figure painting. Although his late works include portraits and genre subject, his most numerous works of this period were paintings of rock pools in Brittany. The canvases were highly colored; the pigment thickly applied with impressive decorative effect of the compositions. In his final days, Dearth frequently used objects from his substantial collection of Gothic, Renaissance, and Eastern artifacts as his subjects or as backgrounds. His final pictures incorporated important Japanese screens, early Chinese paintings, and stone carvings of the Wei period in still life arrangements or as backgrounds for some finely modeled figures.

== Death, reception and posthumous fame ==
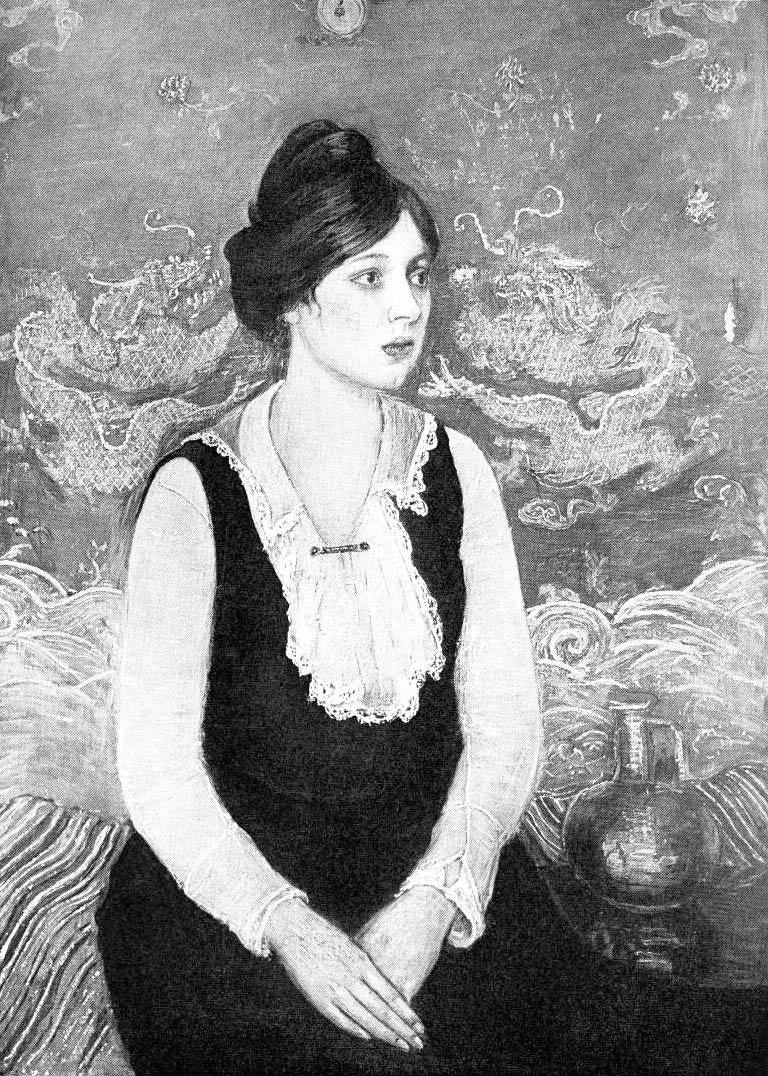
The Imperial Dragon (before 1918), private collection. One of the paintings on display in the memorial exhibition, and an example of the artist's incorporation of Japanese motifs into his later compositions.

Henry Golden Dearth died of a heart attack on March 27, 1918, at his home at 116 E. 63 Street, New York City.

Dearth's works from the 1890s to the early 1900s show him to be the landscape painter of considerable delicacy, refinement, and imaginative feeling. Paintings such as Springtme Montigny (1899) and Montigny (1898) exemplify his conscientious regard for the facts of nature, combined with a notable faculty for their poetic interpretation in artistic terms. His pictures are full of light and atmosphere, and no matter how brilliant his color schemes, the result is a subtle depth of tone instead of hardness. When Boulogne Harbor was exchanged for Cornelia in Metropolitan Museum of Art, the New York Times critic commented that "the two pictures seen together would have formed an extraordinary commentary on the completeness and rapidity of a style change possible to an impressionable painter". In the works dating from 1912 and beyond, he freely used pure color spots and splashes in order to render what he saw so that the paintings display great harmony and are pervaded with a rich, unctuous feeling.

After his death, a memorial exhibition was organized by Mrs. Henry Golden Dearth and Cornelia B. Sage Quinton, Director of the Buffalo Fine Arts Academy and Albright Art Gallery in the principal museums or art galleries in the cities of Buffalo, New York, Detroit, Pittsburgh, St. Louis, Muskegon, Youngstown, Chicago, Cleveland, Milwaukee, Des Moines, Cincinnati, Minneapolis, Worcester, Providence and Boston in 1919.

== Affiliations and awards ==
Dearth became a member of the Society of American Artists in 1888 and was elected to full Academician in 1906 when the National Academy and the Society merged. He was also a member of the Fencers Club, Lotos Club, and the Century Association. He won the Society of American Artists' Webb prize in 1893. He also won a bronze medal at the Exposition Universal in Paris (1900) and silver medals at the Pan-American Exposition in Buffalo (1901) and at an exhibition in Buenos Aires (1907).

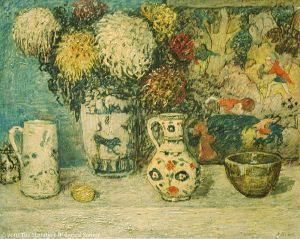
Still Life (before 1918), Mattatuck Museum. An example of Dearth's later still life works.

== Existing works in museums ==
- In the Gloaming, 1889, Detroit Institute of Arts
- Flecks of Foam, 1911–1912, National Gallery of Art, Washington.
- The Stubble Field, 1890s, Cleveland Museum of Art
- Landscape with Brook, c 1900, Mattatuck Museum Arts and History Center
- Still Life, not dated, Mattatuck Museum Arts and History Center
- An Old Church at Montreuil, 1906–1907, Smithsonian American Art Museum
- Dreamland, not dated, Brooklyn Museum
- Harvest Time in Norman, Berlin Museum, bought by the German government in 1903 International Exhibition in Berlin
- Boulogne Harbor, Metropolitan Museum of Art, later exchanged by his later portrait work titled Cornelia
- The Blue Coat, c. 1912, Chrysler Museum of Art, Norfolk, VA

== Exhibitions in chronological order ==
- 1888: Exhibition of the American Academy in New York
- 1901: Exhibition of the Fine Arts, Buffalo, NY
- 1902: Union League Club
- 1903: the International Exhibition in Berlin, Germany
- 1904: Lotos Club (with other members), New York
- 1907: Oehme Gallery (Representative American Artists)
- 1907: Lotos Club, New York
- 1909: Yearly Exhibition of the Pennsylvania Academy of the Fine Arts, Philadelphia
- 1910: Detroit Museum of Art (with Paul Dessar)
- 1911: Buffalo Fine Arts Academy
- 1912: Albright Art Gallery, Buffalo
- 1912: Pennsylvania Academy of the Fine Arts, Philadelphia
- 1912: Knoedler Galleries, New York
- 1913: Pennsylvania Academy of the Fine Arts, Philadelphia
- 1913: New York Montross Gallery, New York
- 1916: Milwaukee Art Institute, Milwaukee
- 1916: Arts Club of Chicago, Chicago
- 1918: The Milch Galleries, New York
