= Emma Howard Wight =

American dramatist (1863–1935)

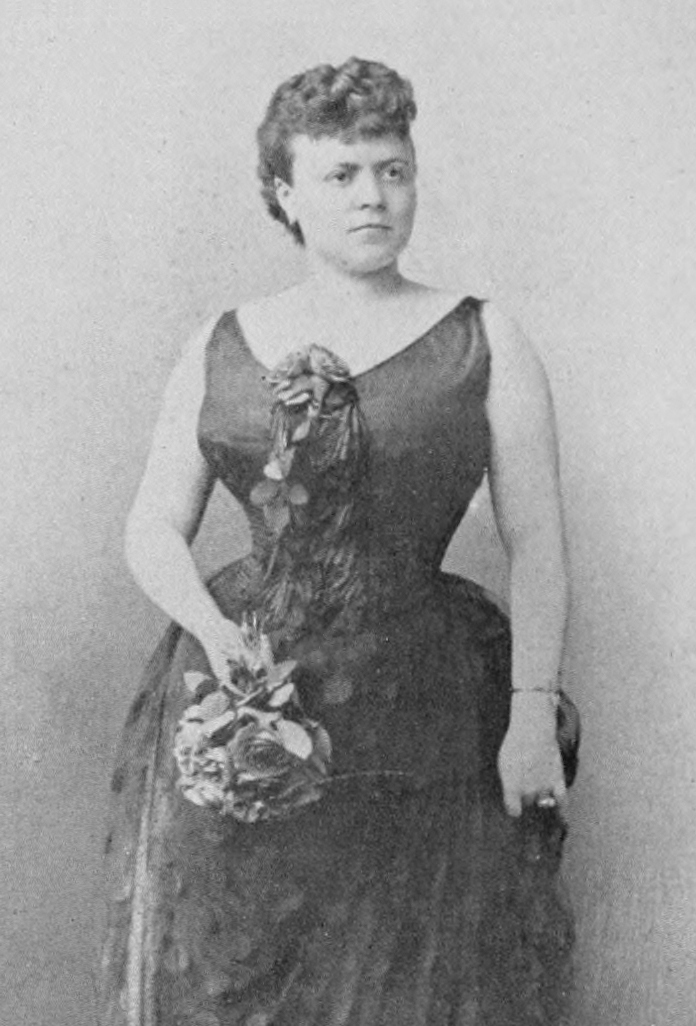
- Photo in A Woman of the Century
- Born: August 25, 1863; Baltimore, Maryland, U.S.
- Died: June 24, 1935 (aged 71); Winchester, Virginia, U.S.
- Education: Academy of Visitation, Baltimore
- Occupations: Author; newspaper correspondent
- Partner: Bertha von Hillern

Emma Howard Wight (August 25, 1863 – June 24, 1935) was an American author and newspaper correspondent. After leaving school, she wrote occasionally for amusement. Her friend, Bertha von Hillern, induced Wight to start publishing her work. Articles by Wight appeared in various papers and were extensively copied. Her numerous theological articles attracted wide attention. She also wrote serial novels. Among her works can be counted Passion Flowers and the Cross. A novel (1891), The Soul of Edmund Jaffray, an emotionalism in 1 act (1892), My Husband (1893), A Loveless Marriage (1894), The Little Maid of Israel (1900), The Berkleys (1900), and Like No Other Love (1910).

== Early life and education ==
Emma Howard Wight was born in Baltimore, Maryland, August 25, 1863. She was the only daughter of Jacob Howard Wight (died 1891), a tobacco broker of that city. She was of English ancestry, her father's ancestors having come over with Lord Baltimore. Her paternal grandmother was a Miss Howard. On the maternal side, she was also descended from an old Maryland family. She had at least one sibling, a brother, William M. Wight.

Wight was educated in the Academy of Visitation, Baltimore. From early on, she showed a talent for writing, her school compositions having always been highly commended.

== Career ==
For some years after leaving school, her time was given to society, though she occasionally wrote a little for her own amusement. At length, acting upon the advice of friends, she submitted some of her writings with a view to their publication. They were promptly accepted, and her productions subsequently appeared in some of the best journals in the country. Some of her theological articles were especially commented upon by Cardinal James Gibbons, and were copied in some of the leading English journals.

In October, 1889, Wight and Von Hillern stayed at Hotel Roanoke, Roanoke, Virginia. Their plans were to visit the Blue Ridge Mountains where Von Hillern would sketch and Wight was to gather materials for a future novel. Thereafter, they planned to return to Von Hillern's summer studio at Fishers Hill, Virginia. But they were in Baltimore in March 1890 for the city's dog show, where second prize was awarded to Wight's dog "Harry", a Blenheim shepherd, who was said to be the only one of the breed in the U.S. In July, Wight and Von Hillern and "Harry" were in Chicago.

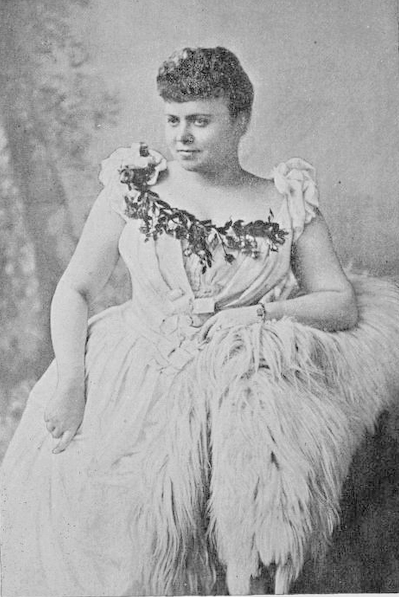
1891

Wight's novel, Passion Flowers and the Cross, appeared in 1891 and received great attention in the literary world. The Soul of Edmund Jaffray, an emotionalism in 1 act was published the following year.

In October 1910, Wight sold the American rights of her playlet, Like No Other Love, to Adelaide Klein, who would produce the play at a Chicago theatre. In December of that same year, the home that Wight and Von Pillern shared was set on fire, with losses totaling US$12,000 and including rare paintings, jewelry, silverware, and other valuables. Their dog, a Scotch collie, which was said to have given the alarm at night when several similar attempts were made to burn the house, was poisoned a few days earlier. Wight believed that certain interests had conspired to oust the women from their home in Middletown, Virginia in order to get their land.

Wight was associated with the women's suffrage movement in Virginia, which gave women the right to vote in 1920. She was fond of outdoor exercise and a great promoter of health and beauty.

== Death ==
For many years, Wight lived and wrote in Winchester, Virginia. She died there, June 24, 1935, though two years earlier, during the Great Depression, Wight and Von Hillern had moved from their home to the Frederick County Poor Farm. Wight was buried at the Mount Hebron Cemetery and Gatehouse.

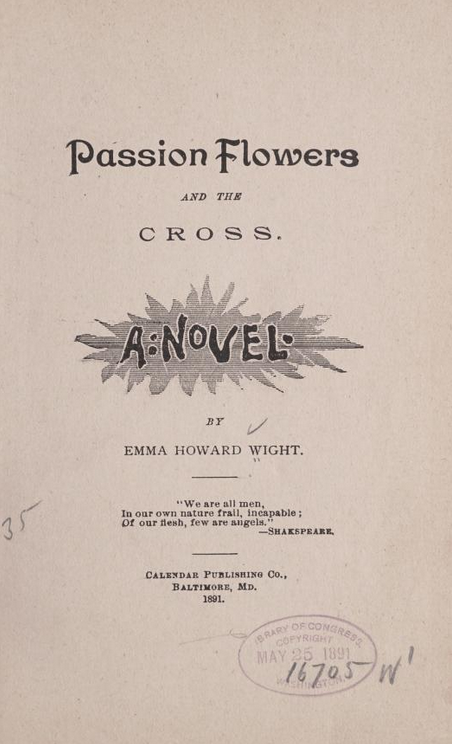
Passion Flowers and the Cross, 1891

== Selected works ==
- Passion Flowers and the Cross. A novel, 1891
- The Soul of Edmund Jaffray, an emotionalism in 1 act, 1892
- My Husband, 1893
- A Loveless Marriage, 1894
- The Little Maid of Israel, 1900
- The Berkleys, 1900
- Like No Other Love, 1910
