= Snapp House (Fishers Hill, Virginia) =

Historic house in Virginia, United States

- U.S. National Register of Historic Places
- Virginia Landmarks Register
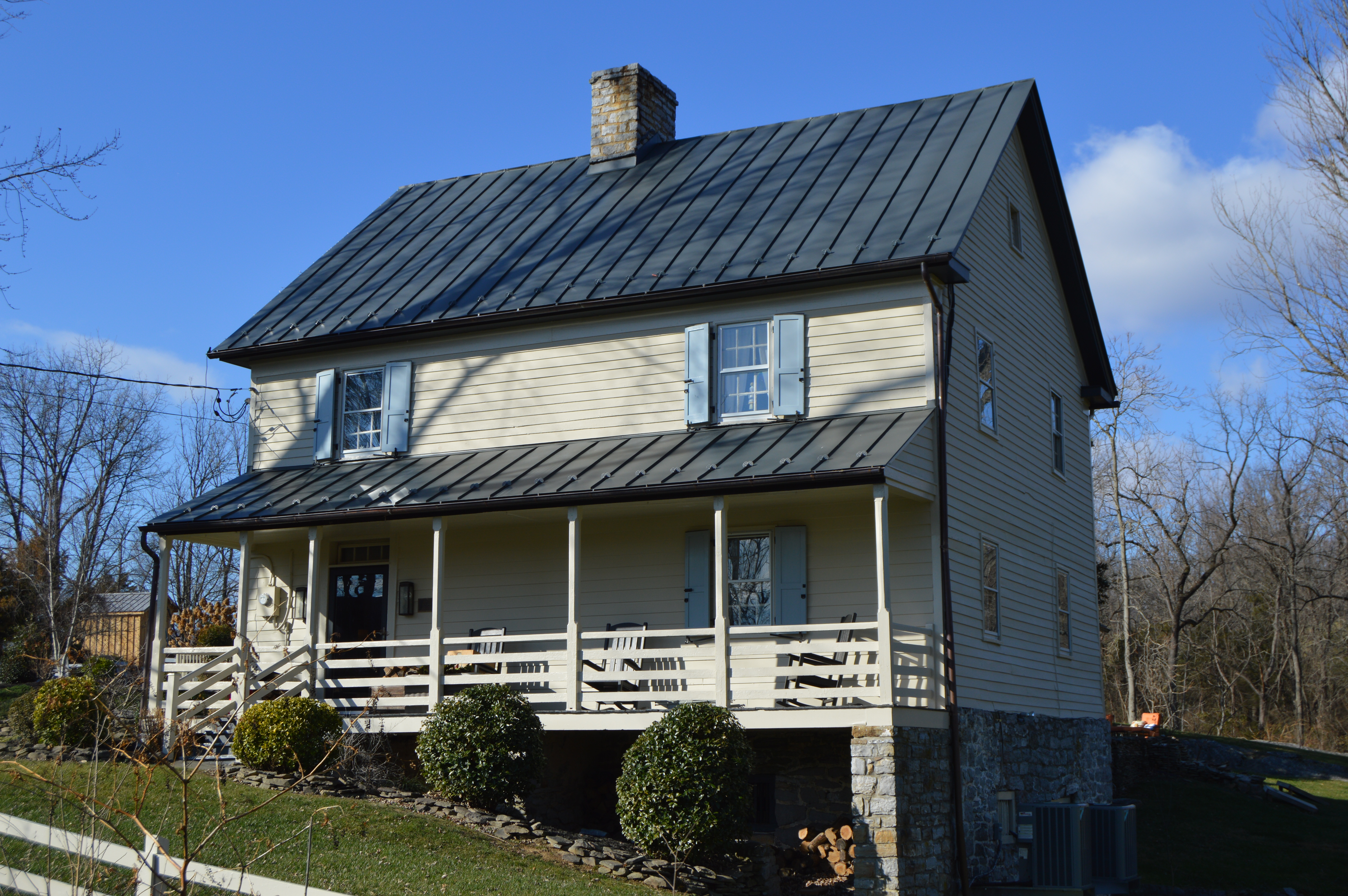
- Front and northeastern side

- Location within Virginia Location within the United States
- Location: Southwest of Fishers Hill on VA 757, near Fishers Hill, Virginia
- Coordinates: 38°58′20″N 78°25′30″W
- Area: 2 acres (0.81 ha)
- Built: c. 1790
- NRHP reference No.: 79003085
- VLR No.: 085-0029

Significant dates
- Added to NRHP: May 7, 1979
- Designated VLR: November 21, 1978

Snapp House, also known as Wildflower Farm, is a historic home located near Fishers Hill, Shenandoah County, Virginia. It was built about 1790, and is a two-story Continental log dwelling sheathed in weatherboard. It sits on a limestone basement and has a two-story, rubble limestone rear ell with a central chimney. A small frame structure connects the log section to the rear ell. Also on the property is the contributing site of a spring house.

It was listed on the National Register of Historic Places in 1979.
