= Guy Vandenbranden =

Belgian artist (1926–2014)

Guy Vandenbranden (July 14, 1926 – June 3, 2014) was a Belgian artist. He has worked as a painter, draftsman, collage artist, sculptor and graphic artist.

== Style and work ==
From 1951 onwards, Guy Vandenbranden said goodbye to figuration and started to work lyrically abstract. In 1952, Vandenbranden ended up in the Brussels art scene and became friends with Pol Bury, Jo Delahaut, Kurt Lewy, Jean Rets and Jean Milo. Thanks to these contacts, Guy Vandenbranden joined the artists' group "Art Abstrait" in 1956. Vandenbranden worked completely geometrically abstract from 1954 on and practiced this visual language consistently until his death in 2014. Around 1958, Vandenbranden worked mainly in black and white, his artworks almost coming to monochromy and there was a clear connection with the work of the American Hard Edge of that time. From 1961, Vandenbranden started working with relief and his first abstract sculptures were created. From 1967 onwards Guy Vandenbranden started to spray cellulose lacquer directly on panels with the aim to create visual illusions (akin to the Op Art).

== New Flemish School ==
In 1959, Vandenbranden and Jef Verheyen planned to open an Antwerp avant-garde gallery to bring together artists with a like-minded spirit. Piero Manzoni, Jean Tinguely and Lucio Fontana had pledged to work together, but in the end this project jumped and G58 took the role as platform for a new (European) avant-garde at the Hessenhuis in Antwerp. After their project ended, Vandenbranden and Jef Verheyen forged plans with Englebert Van Anderlecht to the establishment of the New Flemish School in 1960. This artists' group, including Paul Van Hoeydonck, Jan Dries and Vic Gentils, aimed to promote their art internationally with exhibitions in Germany, Switzerland and Italy.

== Selection of solo exhibitions ==
1950

Galerie St. Laurent, Brussels (Belgium)

1952

Galerie St. Laurent, Brussels (Belgium)

Galerie Iris, Antwerp (Belgium)

1956

Galerie Het Atelier, Antwerp (Belgium)

1958

Albert Landry Gallery, New York (USA)

1959

Galerie St.Laurent, Brussels (Belgium)

Galleria Pater, Milan (Italy)

1960

Galerie Aujourd'hui, Brussels (Belgium)

1961

Galerie Orez, Den Haag (The Netherlands)

1963

Musée des Beaux-Arts, Verviers (Belgium)

1964

Galerie Müller, Stuttgart (Germany)

1966

Galerie Le Zodiaque, Brussel (Belgium)

Galerie Bernard, Solothurn (Switzerland), with artist Roger Raveel

1979

Galerie Schneller, Düsseldorf (Germany)

1981

Morley Gallery, Londen (UK)

== Selection of books and catalogs ==
Monographs

- Jole Marcel van & Ernest Van Buynder, Guy Vandenbranden. Een halve eeuw constructivisme, uitgeverij Snoeck, Gent, 2006
- Tiefenthal Marc, De opbouw in lijn gezet / 50 jaar constructivisme. Monografie omtrent de schilder Guy Vandenbranden, Pandora, Antwerpen, 2001
- Vermeiren David, Guy Vandenbranden. Een abstract leven, Callewaert Vanlangendonck Gallery, Antwerpen, 2014
- Vermeiren David, Guy Vandenbranden. Inner Circle, Callewaert Vanlangendonck Gallery, Antwerpen, 2016

Magazines and articles

- Jespers, Henri-Floris, 'Galerie Saint Laurent: Guy Vandenbranden (3/6)', Connexion, afl. 17 (2009), 7–11
- Mertens, Phil, 'Guy Vandenbranden. Kunst en integratie', Streven, 49/2 (1981), 168 e.v.
- Vree, paul De, 'De Nieuwe Vlaamse School. Voor- en achtergronden' (themanummer), De Tafelronde, 16/1 (1971)

== Death and legacy ==
On June 3, 2014, Guy Vandenbranden died in Antwerp and bequeathed his archives to the Antwerp Callewaert Vanlangendonck Gallery. This gallery then founded the 'Estate Guy Vandenbranden', which manages the artistic oeuvre of Guy Vandenbranden and promotes it at home and abroad.
