= Callewaert Vanlangendonck Gallery =

Art gallery in Antwerp, Belgium

Coordinates: 51.2200°N 4.4097°E

Callewaert Vanlangendonck Gallery is a Belgian art gallery for abstract art in Antwerp. It was founded in 2012 by Yoeri Vanlangendonck and Brecht Callewaert in the Wolstraat in Antwerp. In 2013 a second space opened in the same street. In 2017, the gallery expanded with a 17th-century building in the Antwerp university area, renovated by architects Rolies + Dubois and opened by Minister of Culture Sven Gatz and university Rector Herman Van Goethem.

Artists such as Guy Vandenbranden, Paul Van Hoeydonck, Pol Bury, Michel Seuphor, Jan Dries, Jan Cox, Mark Verstockt and Gilbert Swimberghe exhibited at the gallery. In addition to exhibiting the work of abstract artists from the fifties and sixties, the gallery also represents the estate of Guy Vandenbranden and manages its artists' archive. The gallery also collaborates with contemporary artists such as Koen van den Broek, Guillaume Bijl, Timothy Segers, Jef Meyer and Boy & Erik Stappaerts.

== Publications ==
Callewaert Vanlangendonck Gallery publishes books about her artists in collaboration with historian David Vermeiren. Art editions are also published. For example, in 2016 the gallery published the silkscreen 'Cox' in collaboration with artist Koen van den Broek.

- David Vermeiren, Guy Vandenbranden, Antwerpen, Callewaert Vanlangendonck Gallery, Antwerpen 2014
- David Vermeiren, Jan Saverys en de groep Art Abstrait, Callewaert Vanlangendonck Gallery, Antwerpen 2015
- David Vermeiren, Guy Vandenbranden. Inner Circle, Callewaert Vanlangendonck Gallery, Antwerpen, 2017
- David Vermeiren, Mark Verstockt. Ontwikkeling en genese van een vormentaal, Callewaert Vanlangendonck Gallery, Antwerpen, 2018
