= Mark Verstockt =

Belgian multidisciplinary artist

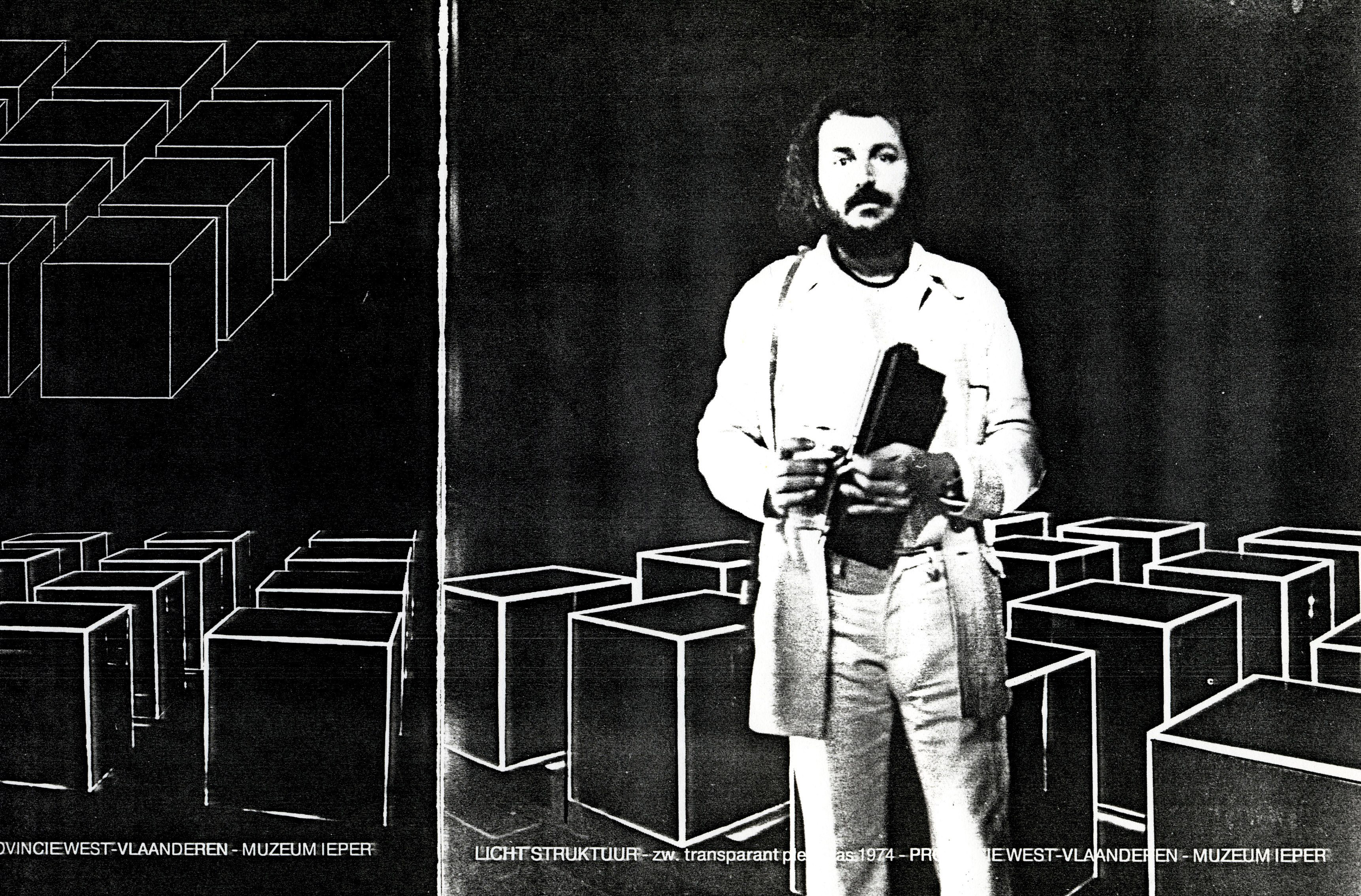
- Born: 16 July 1930; Lokeren, Belgium
- Died: 14 May 2014 (aged 83); Antwerp, Belgium
- Occupations: Graphic designer; sculptor; painter; art theorist

Mark Verstockt or Marc Verstockt (16 July 1930 – 14 May 2014) was a Belgian multidisciplinary artist. Since the 1950s he has been working on an oeuvre containing paintings, drawings, sculptures, publications, video and his own theory about form. His work has shown itself in different styles over time as lyrical abstraction, constructivism and minimalism. An overall constant is his fascination for the geometric figures such as the circle, the triangle and especially the square.

== Career ==
=== Education ===
Verstockt starts his studies in philosophy and literature at Ghent University. Then he went to the Academy of Antwerp and he finished studying at HISK Antwerp. There he develops as a painter in the trend of lyrical abstraction, a movement growing in Paris at that time. His first works follow this movement with references to nature and the cosmos. During his studies he met Dan Van Severen, they both find their way into constructivism.

=== 1960–1980 ===
From 1963 Verstockt started creating monochrome geometrical structures, mostly based on the square. During the midst of 1960, he attained a geometrical visual language. At the end of 1960 he chose resolutely for the geometrical abstraction, leaving the lyrical tendency behind. Verstockt claimed that for him the geometrical aspect is secondary to the structure. His fascination for the square and cubes is notable in his work from that point onwards. In later works he can be seen as a defender of minimal art.

Verstockt always keeps looking for different kinds of experiments to further his structural research. Besides being an independent artist, Verstockt also worked as a graphic designer making posters and books. In 1971 he published his own book after 20 years of research called This is not a book, challenging the essence of what a book should be and how it should be made. He also deepens his research of the geometrical forms in some (monumental) sculptures. His most known sculpture in Belgium is The Signal from 1972 that was situated in Sint-Niklaas. Together with his other sculptures such as Yellow object from 1968 and Plexiglass boxes from 1974, he became a defender of minimal art. He kept on looking for new materials and techniques, exploring new media such as video art. Verstockt wants to reintegrate art into society by letting it meet with current developments.

=== After 1980 ===
In 1982 Verstockt published his theory called The Genesis of Form, from Chaos to Geometry. The book is an in-depth study of form after 30 years of working. This shows again how much research Verstockt puts in his work. His exploration of new media was still ongoing and in 1986 he uses one of the first computers available in Belgium to make a series of drawings on the theme of the square.

Until 1996 he worked and lived in Antwerp, he even was a teacher at HISK in Antwerp. In 1996 he moved to Fays and lived and worked there. He died in 2014 in Antwerp at the age of 84.

=== Legacy ===
Verstockt is most known in Belgium due to his monumental works in public space. For example The signal is a visual recognizable image. Other typical examples are the sculpture Caduceus, which he made for the Flemish Parliament, and the floor drawing which he made in the Ancienne Belgique in Brussels.

== Works ==
=== This is not a book (1971) ===
Verstockt described This is not a book as a non-book that searches for the essence of what a book can be. It is a reaction on Marshall MacLuhan saying that the book known by us through Gutenberg standards is dead. Verstockt sees the statement of MacLuhan as a provocation that points out other forms of a book outside of the printed letters exist. The book comes in a white plastic square box with a window, inside are cardboard sheets, plastic, three pop-ups, a vinyl produced by Verstockt, a catalogue, a page in Braille, a package with 6 cardboard plates for 3D construction and a life size poster of Verstockt himself. The non-book is an exercise in looking with a new form of interaction included, the viewer is invited to use the book and participate.

=== The signal (1972) ===
The signal was a monumental steel sculpture with a height of 18 meters. It was located at the entrance to Sint-Niklaas, Belgium, along the exit of the highway next to the Waasland Shopping Center. With the expansion of the commercial center in 2004, the sculpture disappeared and got replaced by an advertising column. Verstockt was never officially informed and there is confusion about what happened tot the sculpture. Art platform WARP organized a writing contest to bring attention the disappearance called Without a trace, young writers could submit their own version of events about the missing sculpture.

=== Five acts on screen (1974) ===
Five acts on screen was a video Verstockt realized in 1974 published by Continental in Antwerp. It is a registration of himself during a creative process. In the same year an article called Some Notes on video art in Belgium was written by Jan Debbaut, a critic and curator. Debbaut writes that Verstockt is trying to change the screen into a kind graphic support. One of the aims of the video is to make the spectator let loose of the scheme spectator-screen-actor-support and find different ways. Much as deconstructing the concept book in This is not a book, Verstockt now is looking for the possibilities of video art.

=== Pyrography (2002) ===
Verstockt kept on searching for different types of materials and techniques. In 2002 he started using the technique of pyrography on metal and bamboo leaves. It is a slow manual process that does not allow any moment of inattention. The lines created have a whole other appearance than that of ink.

== Theory ==
=== The Genesis of the Form (1982) ===
In 1982 Verstockt's fascination for the geometrical forms and objects gets translated into the book The Genesis of Form, from Chaos to Geometry. He worked 20 years on researching the subject before finishing it in a publication. It became an illustrated source of information about the symbolism, evolution and history of geometrical forms, signs and structures. It is a tool for artists, designers, students, historians, semiotics... and whoever is interested in visual communication.

== Exhibitions ==
=== Solo exhibitions ===
- This is really not a Retrospective exhibition, Verbeke Foundation, Kemzeke, Belgium, 2010. A retrospective of Verstockt's work as an artist, designer, writer, sculptor and painter.
- Paintings from the 1950s, Callewaert-Vanlangendonck Gallery, September and October 2018. A book was also published, Mark Verstockt. Genesis and development of a form language.

=== Group exhibitions ===
- Forum, Ghent, 1962
- Forum, Ghent, 1963
- Coup de Ville, Sint-Niklaas, 2010. Organised by Warp. Work by more than 30 artists at various locations in the city. A structure consisting of geometrical white L-shaped volumes leaning against each other by Verstockt was presented.
