= Bertha von Hillern =

German-American painter and architect

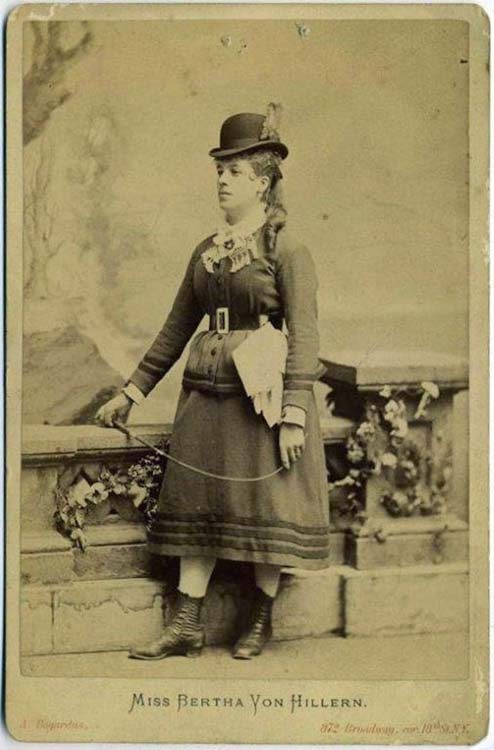
Bertha von Hillern

Bertha von Hillern (4 August 1853, Trier, Prussian Rhineland – 19 September 1939, Staunton, Virginia) was a German-American athlete and artist.

== Biography ==
At the age of twelve, Von Hillern began to study the science of Pedestrianism, and during her teens, she walked in several matches in Berlin and other European cities. Von Hillern emigrated to the United States in October 1875 and settled first in Chicago, Illinois. In February 1876, she participated in the first women's 6 Day Race in history against Mary Marshall. Von Hillern walked 231.5 miles, coming 2.5 miles short of victory. For the next two years, she continued to devote her time to advocating athletic exercises for women, and appearing in public promoting Pedestrianism. She also gave demonstrations of bicycle riding. She gave up her public pedestrian activities to devote herself to the study of art, and later pursued art as a profession in Boston, where she exhibited a large number of landscapes in 1888.

Florida newspapers reported that in the 1880s von Hillern shared an atelier there for some years with an artist from Maine, Maria Graves Beckett, who signed her work "Maria J. C. à Becket". Both women had been students of William Morris Hunt in Boston. She later lived in Richmond and Winchester, Virginia, with Emma Howard Wight.

== Works ==
- "The Monk Felix," from Longfellow's "Golden Legend"
- "Evening Prayer at the Wayside Shrine, Germany" (1883)
- "The Conversion of the Heathen General Placidus, by a Miracle while Hunting" (1885)
- "Live-Oak Forest in the Ojai Valley, California" (1887)
- "St. Paul, the First Hermit"
- "A Walk through the Pine Barrens, Florida" (1888)
