= American Barbizon School =

American art movement

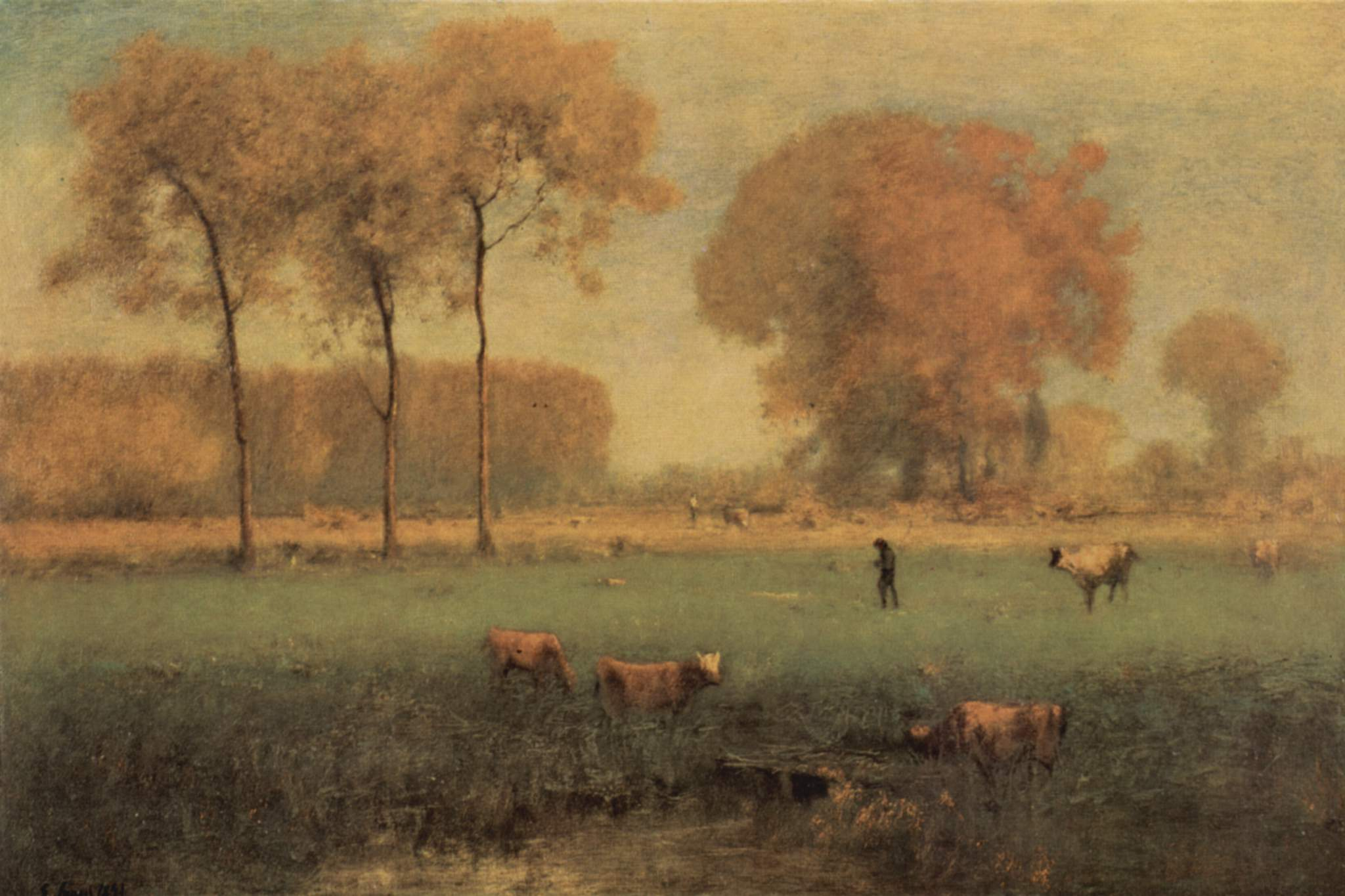
George Inness' Summer Landscape, 1894.

The American Barbizon School was a group of painters and style partly influenced by the French Barbizon School, who were noted for their simple, pastoral scenes painted directly from nature. American Barbizon artists concentrated on painting rural landscapes which often included peasants or farm animals.

William Morris Hunt was the first American to work in the Barbizon style as he directly trained with Jean-François Millet in 1851–1853. When he left France, Hunt established a studio in Boston and worked in the Barbizon manner, bringing the style to the United States of America.

The Barbizon approach was generally not accepted until the 1880s and reached its pinnacle of popularity in the 1890s.

== Artists ==
- Maria a'Becket
- Henry Golden Dearth
- Thomas Eakins
- Winckworth Allan Gay
- Childe Hassam
- Winslow Homer
- William Morris Hunt
- Wilson Irvine
- George Inness
- William Keith
- Edward Mitchell Bannister
- Homer Dodge Martin
- Robert Crannell Minor
- John Francis Murphy
- Henry Ward Ranger
- Henry Ossawa Tanner
- Jules Turcas
- Horatio Walker
- Alexis Jean Fournier
- Joseph Foxcroft Cole
- Homer Watson
- Alexander Helwig Wyant

== General and cited references ==
- Bermingham, Peter (1975). American Art in the Barbizon Mood: Published on the Occasion of an Exhibition at the National Collection of Fine Arts, Smithsonian Institution January 23-April 20, 1975. Washington, D.C.: Published for the National Collection of Fine Arts by the Smithsonian Institution Press. ISBN 9780226694139. OCLC 491467188. Exhibition catalog.
  - Bermingham, Peter (1976). American Art in the Barbizon Mood: A Visual History. London and Chicago: University of Chicago Press. ISBN 9780226694139. OCLC 641755888. Exhibition catalog.
- Farr, Dorothy (1977). Horatio Walker 1858–1938. Kingston, Ontario: Agnes Etherington Art Centre. OCLC 757289234.
