= High key =

A high-key image consists primarily of light tones, without dark shadows. A photograph or painting so composed features a diminished tonal range of primarily whites and light grays. High key as a term used in describing paintings or photographs is related to but not the same as high-key lighting in cinema or photography.

== Gallery ==
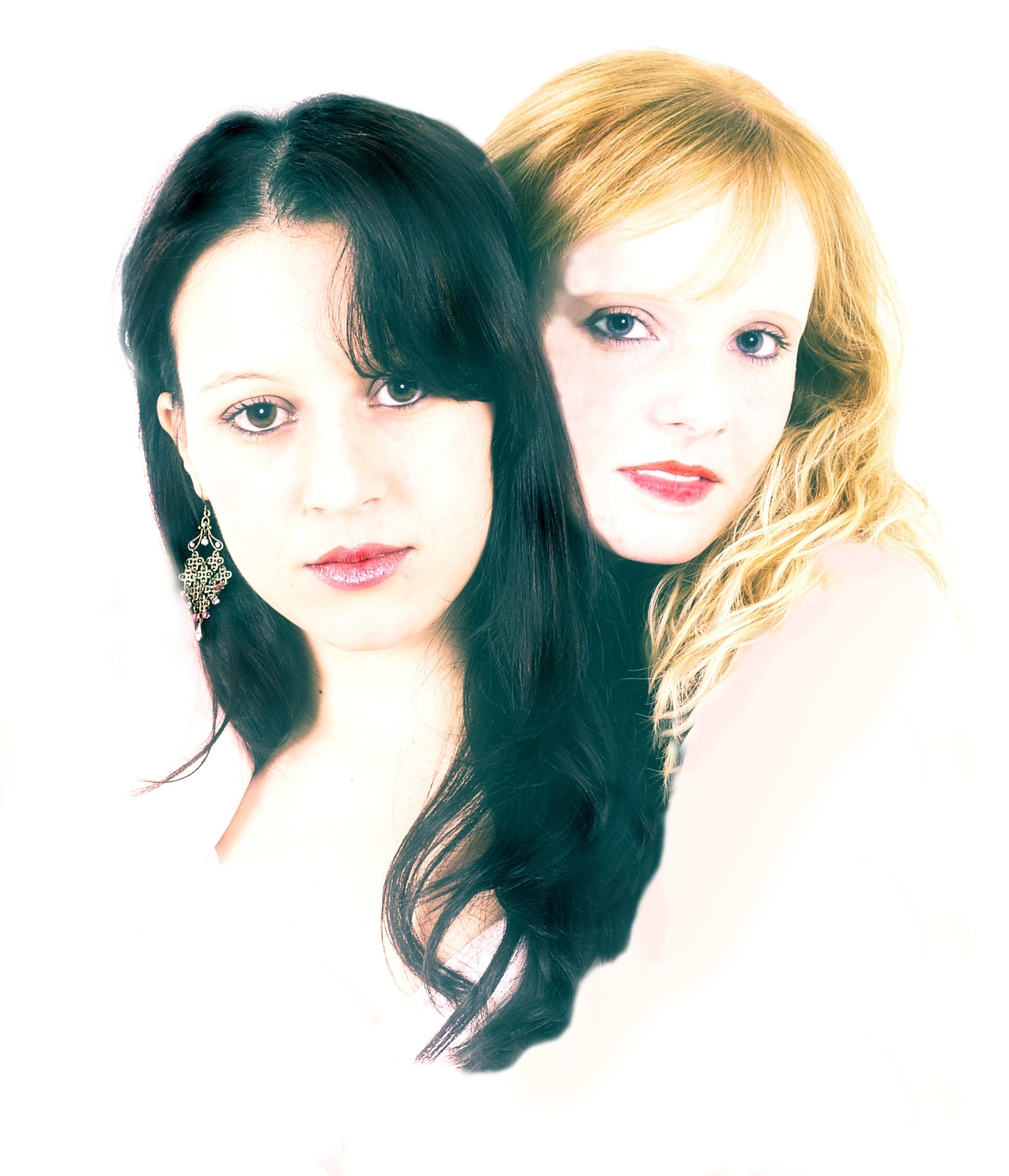

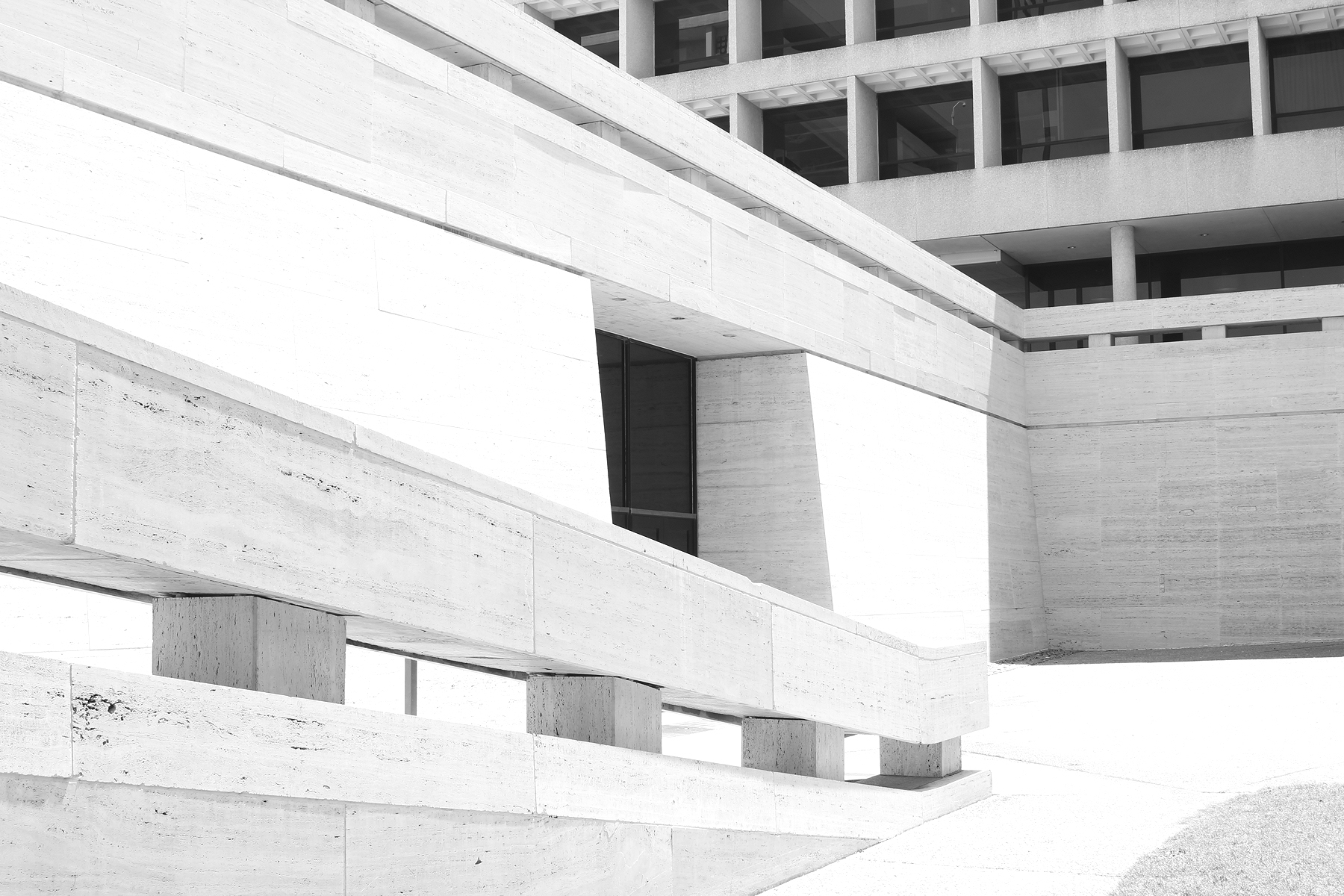

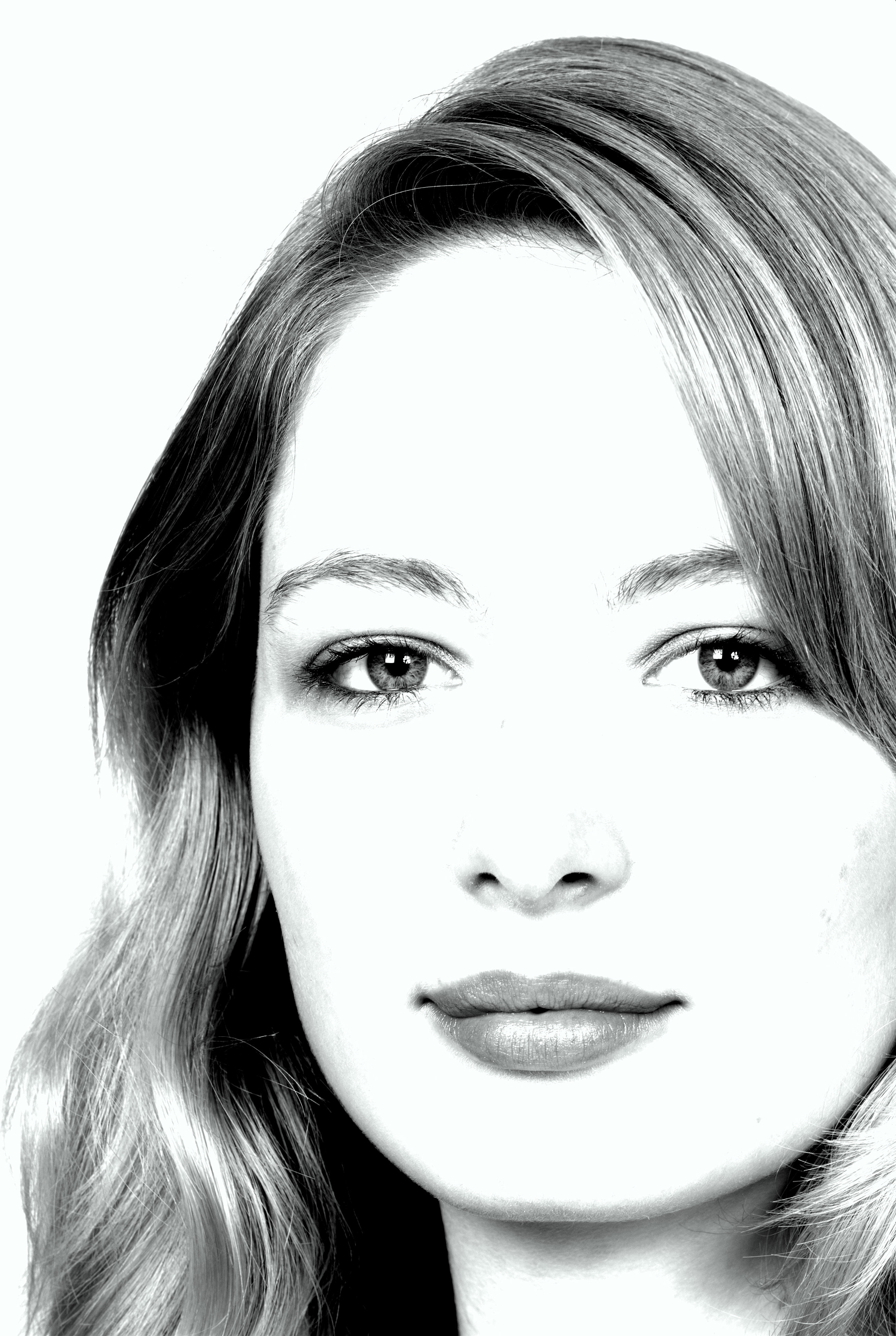

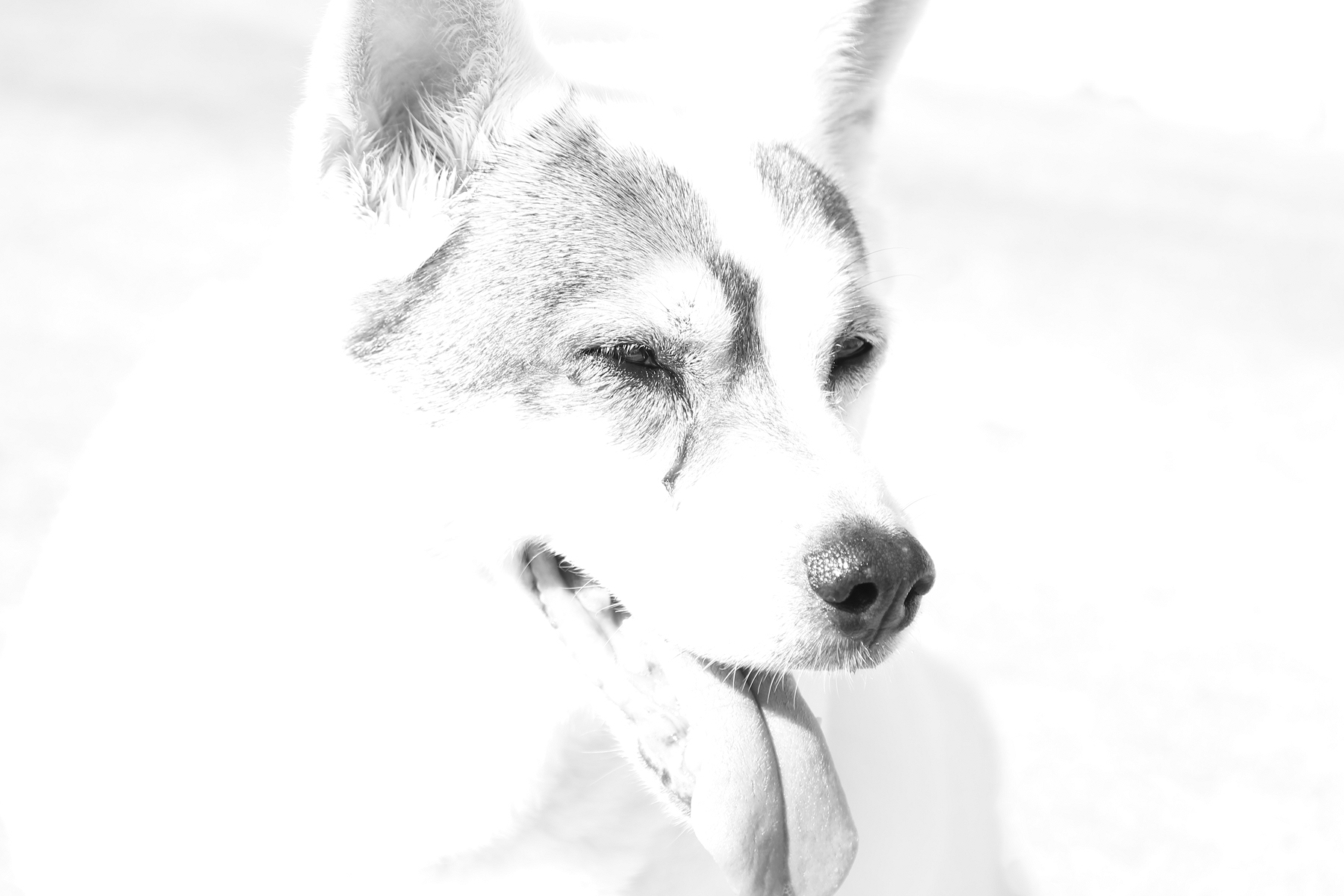

== See also ==
- Low key
