= Low key =

Dark art style

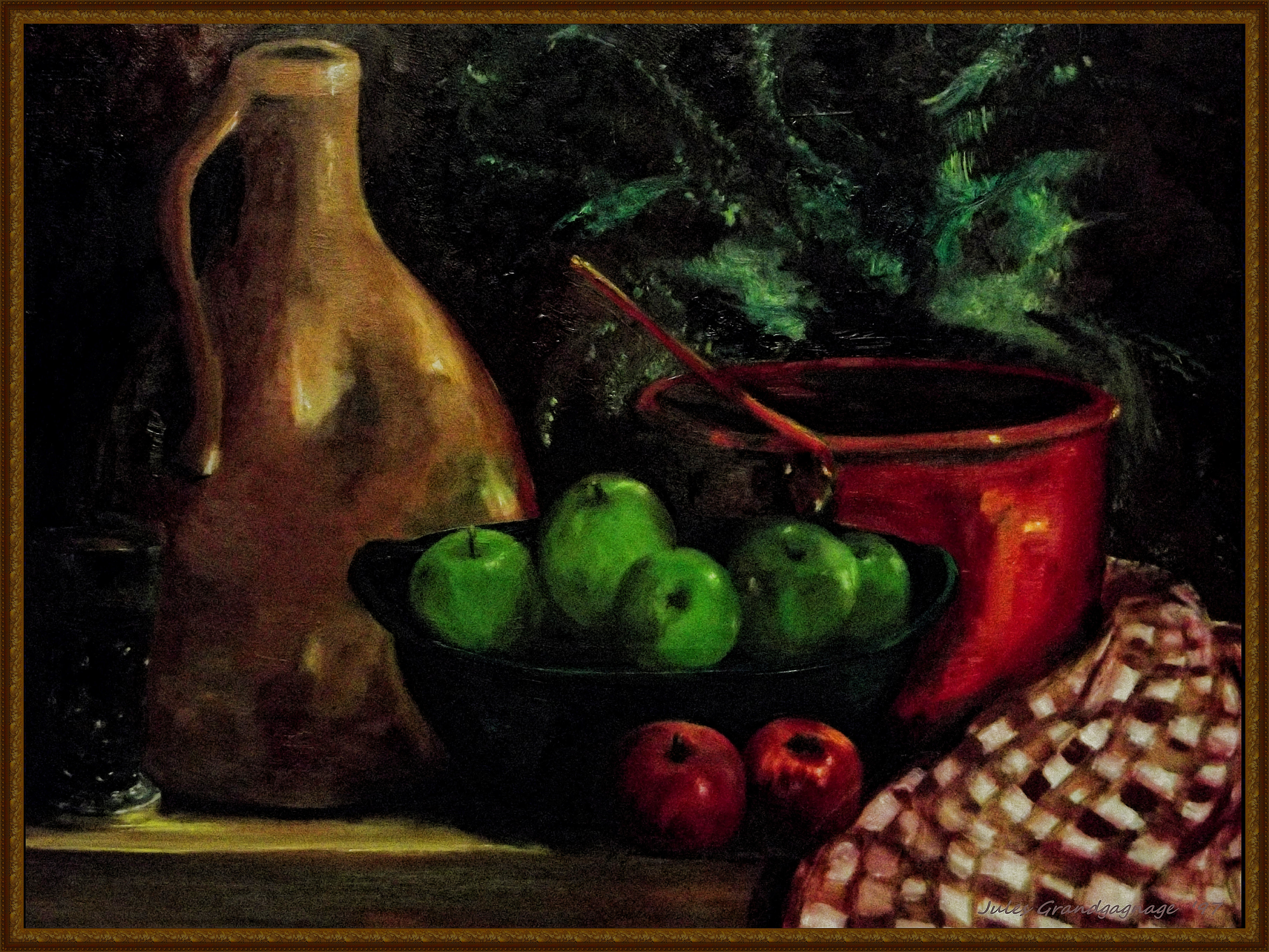
Low key oil painting

Low key as a term used in describing paintings or photographs is related to but not the same as low-key lighting in cinema or photography. A photographic image, painting or movie can be defined as "low-keyly" if its dominant values are black, dark brown or dark blue.

Some authors describe the term "low key" as the so-called Rembrandian light while others describe how to obtain such photographs or paintings.

== See also ==
- High key
- Tenebrism
