= Maria a'Becket =

American painter

- Born: Maria Graves Beckett; July 7, 1839; Portland, Maine
- Died: September 7, 1904 (aged 65)
- Known for: landscape painting
- Movement: American Barbizon School

Marie a'Becket (July 7, 1839 – September 7, 1904) was an American painter associated with the American Barbizon school.

== Life ==
Maria Graves Beckett was born in Portland, Maine. Her father, Charles Beckett (ca. 1813–1866), was a druggist who taught himself to paint after realizing his passion for it. He was "the first native-born Portland Mainer to succeed in the landscape genre" and "exhibited at the American Art Union in 1847, 49, and 50".

He raised her in an artistic setting. At the same time the railways were heavily expanding across the United States, Beckett worked with her father to illustrate for her uncle's promotional railroad material. In 1866, the Beckett family was a part of the Great Fire of Portland, an accidental fire started from a mixture consisting of the Fourth of July fireworks, a dry atmosphere, and hot temperatures. It was the most destructive fire at the time in American history; it consumed around two-thousand buildings and left almost ten-thousand of the city's thirteen-thousand citizens homeless. This fire destroyed the Beckett's family home and apothecary business and also attributes to her father's death two months later of “paralytic shock”. After this tragedy, Maria, her mother, and her brother John converted to Catholicism. "Maria and John dropped the second 't' from their last name and adopted "a’ Becket," aligning themselves with the Medieval Catholic martyr St Thomas a’ Becket".

== Career ==
She was among the first American artists to study with champions of the Barbizon school, known for concentrating on informal rural scenery that fit Romantic conceptions of nature. The Barbizon painters in Europe, such as Théodore Rousseau, Jules Dupre, Camille Corot and Jean-François Millet, fully immersed themselves within the natural settings they used as inspiration. William Morris Hunt was one of the first to embrace and promote the Barbizon style in America; Hunt had been studying art in Paris and was in search of a more spontaneous way of handling paint when he came across Millet's The Sower and purchased it for display in Boston. “The insight of the Barbizon artists was that freer paint handling could capture a fresh appreciation of the spontaneous rhythms of natural scenery” with which Hunt embraced and brought to America.

Hunt began teaching a class in Boston, that Becket joined, a class taught exclusively for women; this was by default, the French manner of painting was not considered manly enough for American men to want to join. Becket quickly went from Hunt's teaching to the source, seeking Charles-François Daubigny to study with him in the countryside north of Paris "probably in the spring and summer of 1876"; Daubigny was the forerunner of and most accomplished among the artists who joined Corot in the French country-side during summer months. She and Daubigny were very similar in their Catholic influences and speed of painting. This connection led Becket to become very close with Daubigny and his family; it was rare for an American painter to join his inner circle. It is said "Beckett follows Daubigny in her liberated, sketch-like, 'painterly' brushstrokes, her unusual color range, and her choice of patently ordinary 'humble' natural scenery as subject matter. Even Daubigny’s oft-cited melancholy recalls the 'peculiar sadness' Beckett identified in her own work". The river scenery where she and Daubigny studied was a magnet for the 19th century artists who would later become known as the Impressionists, such as Renoir, Pissarro, and Monet.

While Becket spent her time in St Augustine, she really distinguished herself as an artist. According to the local society tabloid The Tatler, "she held court with her wit as well as her artistic talent. The Ponce de Leon Hotel artists entertained potential patrons and sold their works at weekend gala receptions where Becket shone as a 'brilliant conversationalist, a delightful raconteur' whose social success at times kept her from opening her studio". She had exhibitions where paintings were rapidly being sold and The Tatler even stated “Miss a Becket paints so rapidly that to see her or hear of the number she adds to her collection sounds like a fairy tale… Miss a Becket has a number of beautiful pictures on exhibition that are constantly changing, that is, are passing into the hands of purchasers and new ones supplying their place”.

After Becket's death on September 7, 1904, she was described as "a painter of uneven power, much truth of perception and at times a vivid sense of color. Some critics assert that at her best Marie a’ Becket was unsurpassed by any American woman landscape painter". The Florida Times Union described "her success in showing the world what a woman can do despite difficulties that would have driven most men to despair", and claimed that her success "has encouraged thousands of her weaker sisters in their struggles to make places for themselves, who should rise up and call her blessed".

It is known that Henry Flagler bought at least two of Becket's works; they are currently displayed in the Presidents Wing, formerly known as the men's lounge of the Ponce de Leon Hotel, and the Flagler Room, formerly known as the Grand Parlor of the Ponce de Leon Hotel, at Flagler College.

a'Becket exhibited her work at the Woman's Building at the 1893 World's Columbian Exposition in Chicago, Illinois.

a'Becket helped blaze a trail for women who wanted to enter the male-dominated world of professional painting in nineteenth-century America. She was able to do while bridging the avant-garde French ideas of Barbizon and its daughter movement, Impressionism, in a wholly American context.

== Gallery ==
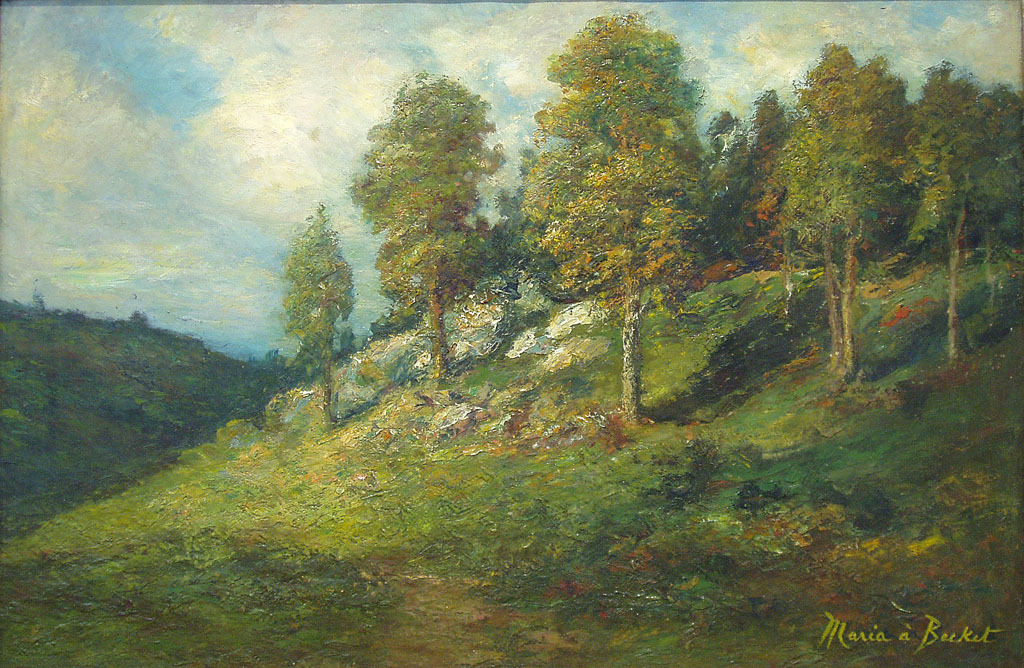
Landscape by Marie a'Becket in Maine's Portland Museum of Art

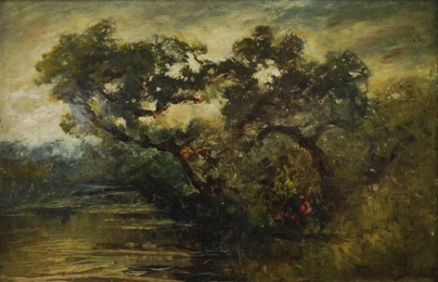
River Landscape by Marie a'Becket

Wave Seascape by Marie a'Becket

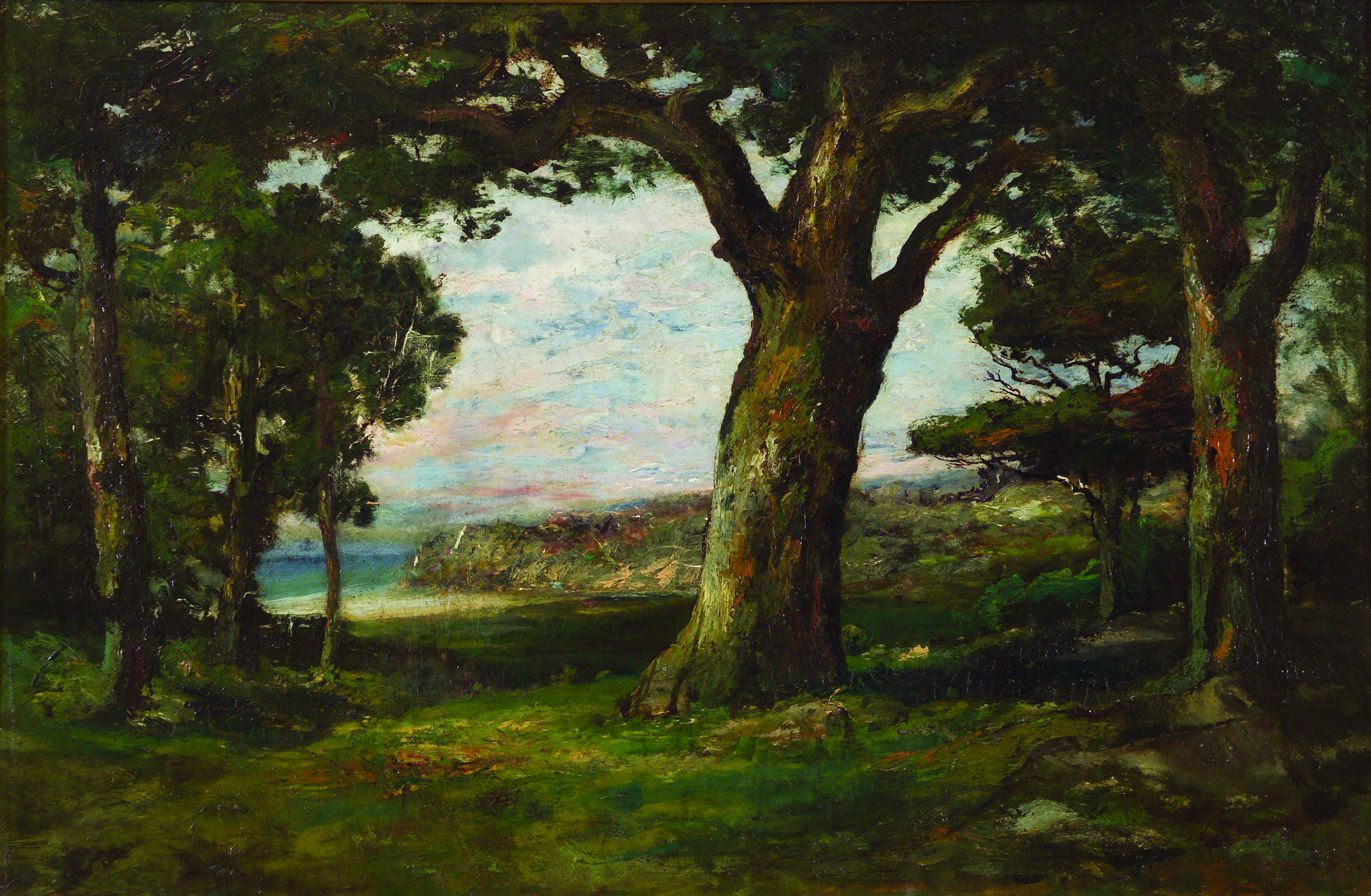
Monarch of the Glen by artist Marie a'Becket, in Henry Flagler's private collection
