= Frederick Historic District =

Historic district in Maryland, United States

- U.S. National Register of Historic Places
- U.S. Historic district
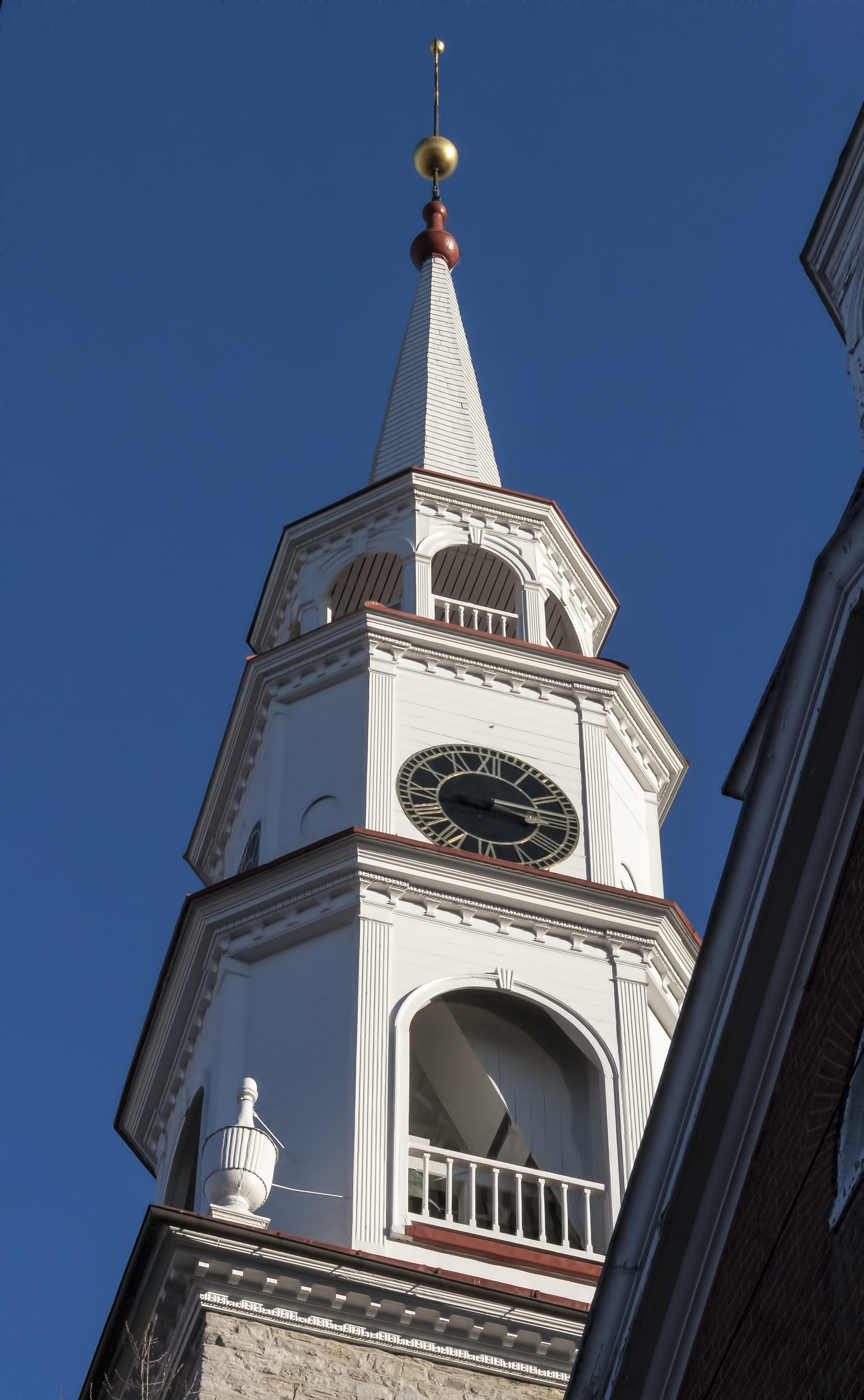
- Trinity Chapel, West Church Street

- Location within Maryland Location within the United States
- Location: 2 blocks E and 3 blocks W of Market St., from South St. to 7th St., Frederick, Maryland (orig); Roughly bounded by Thirteenth, East and Wisner, South and Madison Sts., W. College Terr. and Rosemont and Trail Aves. (increase)
- Coordinates: 39°24′53″N 77°24′43″W
- Area: 265 acres (107 ha) (orig); 825 acres (334 ha) (increase)
- Built: 1800
- Architect: Multiple, including Hiram Winchester
- Architectural style: Greek Revival, Italianate, Federal, Late Victorian,
- NRHP reference No.: 73000916 (original); 88000713 (increase)
- Added to NRHP: October 18, 1973

The Frederick Historic District is a national historic district in Frederick, Maryland. The district encompasses the core of the city and contains a variety of residential, commercial, ecclesiastical, and industrial buildings dating from the late 18th century to 1941. Notable are larger detached dwellings in the Queen Anne and American Foursquare architectural styles of the late 19th and early 20th centuries The churches reflect high style architecture ranging from Gothic and Greek Revival to Richardsonian Romanesque and Colonial Revival. The east side of the district includes the industrial buildings.

It was added to the National Register of Historic Places in 1973, with a boundary increase in 1988.
