= Willie Hensley =

Native Alaskan politician (born 1941)

William "Willie" Hensley
- Iġġiaġruk
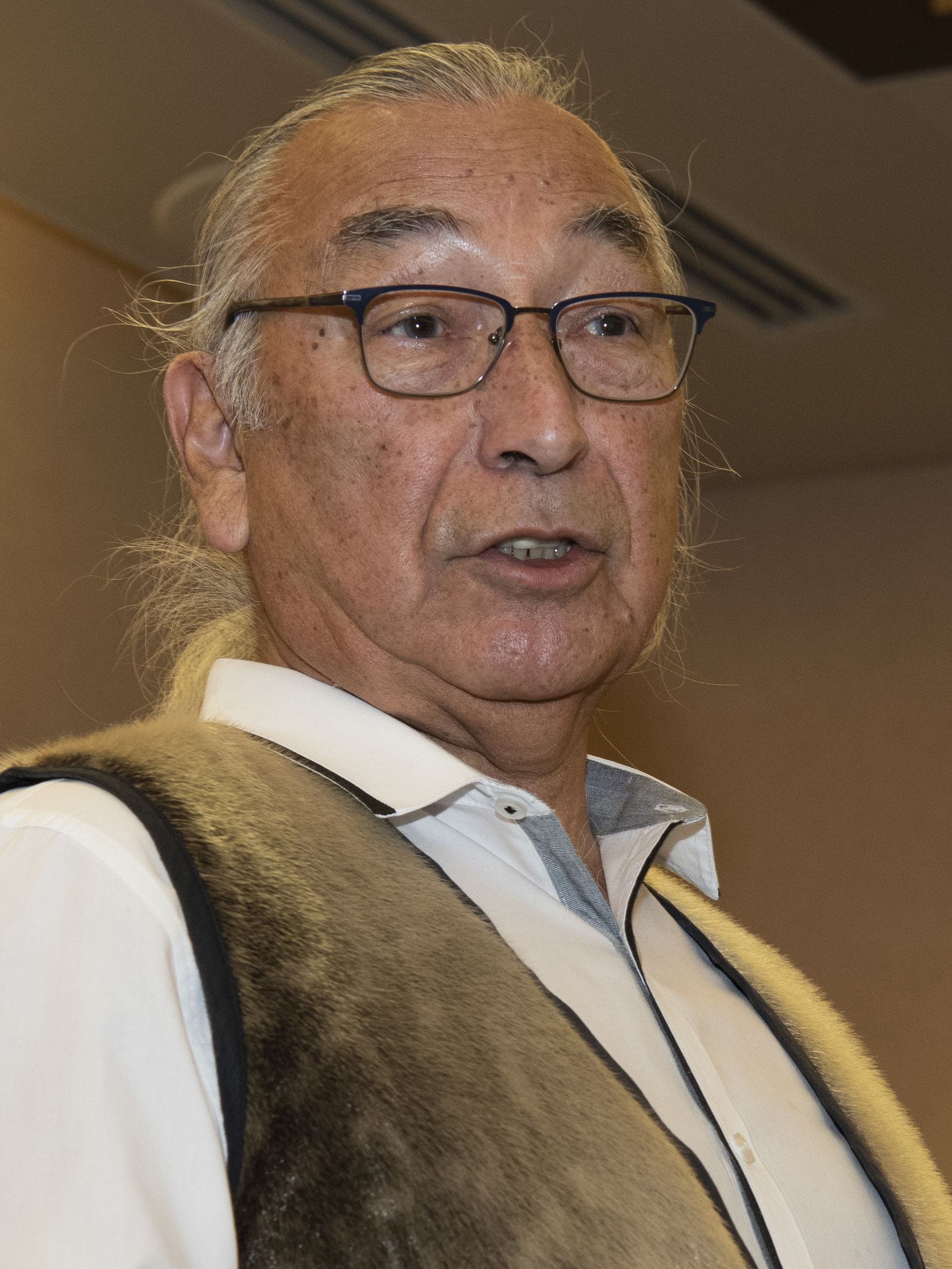
- Willie Hensley in 2022

Member of the Alaska House of Representatives from the 17th district
- In office January 23, 1967 – January 11, 1971
- Preceded by: Jacob A. Stalker
- Succeeded by: Frank R. Ferguson

Member of the Alaska Senate from the K district (J district 1971–1973)
- In office January 11, 1971 – January 20, 1975
- Preceded by: Robert R. Blodgett
- Succeeded by: Redistricted

Member of the Alaska Senate from the L district
- In office January 20, 1987 – January 9, 1989
- Preceded by: Frank R. Ferguson
- Succeeded by: Albert P. Adams

Personal details
- Born: 17 June 1941 (age 85) Kotzebue, Alaska, United States
- Party: Democratic
- Spouse: Abigale Hensley
- Children: 4
- Education: George Washington University
- Occupation: Politician, educator

William L. "Willie" Hensley (born June 17, 1941), also known by his Iñupiaq name Iġġiaġruk (IPA: [eʁʁeɑʁʐuk]), is a semi-retired Democratic politician from the U.S. state of Alaska known for his work regarding Native Alaskan land rights. Hensley played a critical role in the creation of the Alaska Native Claims Settlement Act (ANCSA) of 1971, one of the largest and most important land claims by indigenous peoples in U.S. history. Hensley went on to serve a term in the Alaska House of Representatives (1967–1970), and then a four-year term in the Alaska Senate (1971–1974). Hensley also served another year in the Alaska Senate from 1987 to 1988, when he was nominated by 6th Governor of Alaska Steve Cowper.

Hensley has also had an influential career outside of politics, as founder of the Northwest Alaskan Natives Association Regional corporation (NANA), where he served as president for 20 years. He also helped form the Alaskan Natives Federation and served as co-chairman, executive director, and president. He also is a founder of Maniilaq, a not-for-profit organization that provides essential services for the tribes of Northwest Alaska.

Since retiring from politics, Hensley has written a book titled Fifty Miles from Tomorrow: A Memoir of Alaska and the Real People. The book entails Hensley's childhood growing up in rural Alaska with extended family and his journey as an Alaskan politician and native rights activist.

== Early life and education ==
Hensley was born into a small community in Northwest Alaska, 40 miles above the Arctic Circle. His father was a Jewish Lithuanian fur trader who Hensley never met, and his mother was an Inupiat Eskimo from Kotzebue. At a young age his mother gave him and his sister Saigulik to extended family that lived along the Noatak River delta. Hensley grew up without electricity and running water. He and his family hunted and fished in order to survive the nine-month-long Arctic winters.

Hensley attended Bureau of Indian Affairs elementary school. For secondary education, Hensley attended Harrison-Chilhowee Baptist Academy now known as The King's Academy in Seymour, Tennessee. A Baptist missionary chose and arranged the details in order for Hensley to attend the boarding school. At boarding school, Hensley was a one-time halfback and the co-captain of the school's football team as well as being voted class president.

Graduating from his senior year Hensley chose to study at George Washington University in Washington D.C. He obtained a bachelor's degree in political science with a minor in economics. Hensley studied law at the University of Alaska (1966), University of New Mexico (1967) and University of California (1968). Hensley was awarded an Honorary Doctor of Laws from the University of Alaska in 1980.

== Political career ==
=== ANSCA ===
Hensley's involvement with the Alaska Native land claims issue stemmed from the publishing of his essay "What Rights to Land Have the Alaska Native: The Primary Issue". The essay highlighted Indigenous history and the treatment by the United States as well the laws that governed their right to land rights. Hensley's paper was handed out in the first Alaskan Federation of Native convention, which he co-chaired. Hensley and a handful of other Alaskan Natives tirelessly lobbied the government in Washington until the Alaska Native Claims Settlement Act was passed. This act, signed by President Nixon in 1971, gave Alaskan natives 44 million acres of land as well as a $963 million payment. The land and payment received were shared between 12 regional Alaskan native corporations, one of which Hensley founded.

=== Alaskan House of Representatives ===
In 1966, at the age of 25, Hensley was elected to a position in the House of Representatives for ten years. and was re-elected to the House in 1987 for another two years. Hensley was a Democratic member for both terms and took special interest in native affairs.

=== Alaskan Senate ===
Hensley was first elected to the Alaskan Senate in 1971 for a four-year term. He served on the subcommittees of water resources and of Indian affairs.

Hensley was appointed to the Alaskan Senate for the second time on 20 January 1987 until 1988. He was elected to fill a vacant seat due to the resignation of senator Frank Ferguson. Hensley was one of eight Democratic candidates in the Senate and was the representative for senate district L. During his term Hensley was in the standing committees for Finance, Rules and State Affairs. Hensley also served as Commissioner of Commerce under Alaskan Governor Tony Knowles.

=== 1974 Alaskan Congressional Election ===
In 1974, the Alaska Congressional election of 1974 decided Alaska's sole representative to the United States House of Representatives for a two-year term, from 1975–77. Hensley ran as the Democratic candidate, but lost to Republican candidate Don Young by 7.68 per cent

Alaska's 1974 Congressional Election
Party	Candidate	Votes	%
Republican	Don Young (inc.)	51,641	53.84
Democratic	Willie Hensley	44,280	46.16
Total votes		95,921	100.00
Republican hold			

=== Commissioner of Commerce ===
In 1994, Hensley was chosen by Alaskan Governor Tony Knowles to be Commissioner of Commerce and Economic Development. In this position he became responsible for Alaska's involvement in national tourism, international trade, seafood marketing, insurance and securities.

== Professional career ==
=== Alaskan Federation of Natives ===
Hensley was a principal founder of the Alaska Federation of Natives (AFN) in 1966, serving as president, executive director, president and cochair of the association. The state-wide organisation was initially created to assist Alaskan natives implement ANSCA and to set up the regional corporations required under the act. After those initial challenges were enacted, the AFN evolved to respond to the modern challenges of protecting and providing a political voice for Native issues. Hensley chaired the first AFN convention that was to create the land claims committee in order to achieve a united front regarding the recognition of native land claims and to establish native Alaskans as a strong political force. During the 60s, Hensley was involved in the AFN's lobbying in Washington D.C for legislation to be enacted to recognise native land rights and claims in Alaska.

What gave AFN the ability to move the Nation was the strong spirits of its membership and the ability to focus on the key issues of the day. ... We faced pressures from state politicians as well as members of Congress and our own internal warfare. We persevered, knowing that if we gave up due to our egos being hurt or our issues being ignored, that our people would be the ones to suffer.

— Willie Hensley, Speech to the First Annual Native Hawaiian–Alaska Native Summit, July 6, 2001

=== NANA Regional Corporation ===
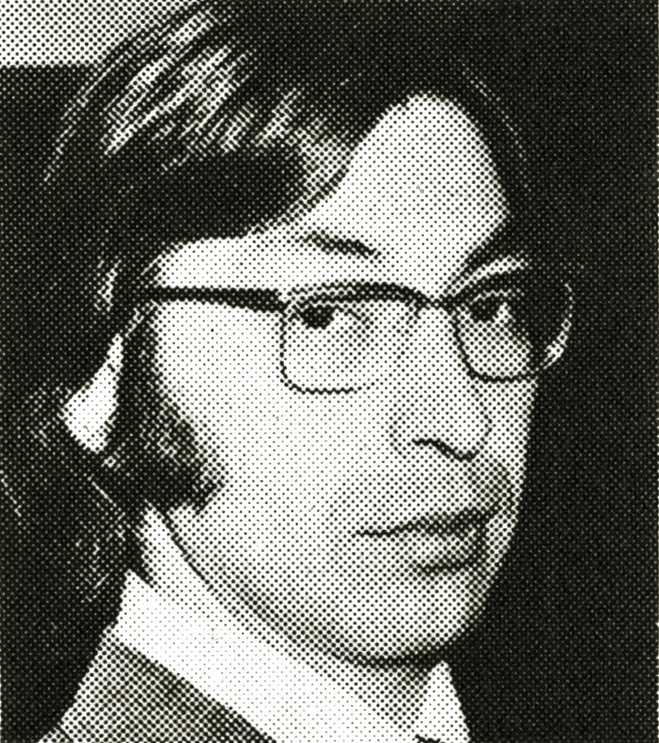
Hensley, 1973

Willie Hensley's contribution to the implementation of the ANSCA led to becoming executive director of one of the regional corporations formed under the Act. The ANSCA applied to the over 200 hundred Native villages and areas in Alaska state, with each area assigned a regional corporation. The 12 regional corporations are responsible for 70 percent of all revenues received by each Regional Corporation that were to be divided among all 12 Regional Corporations in proportion to the number of Alaska natives enrolled in each region. Hensley became executive director of the Northwest Alaska Native Association (NANA). The corporation's goals were to pursue land claims, prioritise Inupiat education, promote political participation, and to improve the overall condition of native living standards. Hensley's Inupiat culture led to the strong movement within NANA for programs to revitalise the culture and social problems his people were facing. To symbolise this solidarity NANA's official symbol is an Iñupiaq hunter moving toward a successful future in a vast, beautiful and sometimes harsh world. Hensley also led a NANA subsidiary, NANA Development Corp, that manages native corporations' business portfolio. Hensley served as director of the corporation for over 20 years, before becoming its president.

Hensley's involvement as director/president of NANA extended to his involvement with the development of the Red Dog mine. Located at Delong Mountain Range about 90 miles north of Kotzebue, Red Dog is one of the world's largest zinc and lead mines, it produces 10 percent of the world's zinc. The mine was developed under an innovative operating agreement and NANA shareholders receive direct benefits from development at the mine. As president at the time, Hensley was one of the main coordinators of the mine and the partnership between NANA, which owned the lands, and Teck, the company that operated the mine.

=== Maniilaq ===
In 1966, Hensley was one of the founders of the Northwest Alaskan Natives Association (NANA). The non-profit corporation was responsible for the advocation of native issues, the economic, medical and social assistance of native communities and peoples, and the raising of institutions and activities crucial to well-being of native persons. When the ANSCA was passed, the for-profit NANA regional corporation that Hensley was executive director of was established. Therefore, the nonprofit NANA changed their name to Manillaq to avoid confusion.

=== Alyeska Pipeline Service Company ===
In 1997, Hensley joined the company Alyeska Pipeline Service Company. The company operates and maintains the trans-Alaska Pipeline System. Hensley was appointed Manager of Federal government relations head of the Washington D.C. Hensley's responsibilities included acting as liaison between Alyeska staff and native Alaskan communities.

=== Educator ===
Since 2011, Hensley became a distinguished visiting professor at the University of Alaska in the Department of Business and Public Policy. Hensley has also taught "Alaska policy Frontiers' at the university, which entails the history and colonisation of Alaska and the impact on modern-day natives and Alaskans.

== Publications ==
=== Essay: What Rights to Land Have the Alaska Native: The Primary Issue" ===
In 1966, Hensley wrote a paper for a constitutional law class at the University of Alaska. The essay was titled " "What Rights to Land Have the Alaska Native: The Primary Issue". The essay discussed American Indian history and their treatment by the United States and the corresponding laws based on agreements between natives and the State. The essay goes into detail about laws such as Indian Claims Commission Act and the Statehood Act and how they affect Indigenous tribes and people within the US. The essay propelled Hensley towards native American activism by beginning the process of going to his hometown of Kotzebue to start claiming back the land for natives. The essay also catalysed the formation of what is now known as the Alaskan Federation of Natives in 1966.

=== Book: "Fifty Miles from Tomorrow; a memoir of Alaska and the real people" ===
Hensley published his biography "Fifty Miles from Tomorrow; a memoir of Alaska and the real people" on 23 December 2008. The book features photos and testimonies from Hensley's childhood as he recounts growing up in northern Alaska and the hardships faced by him and his adoptive family. The book goes on to talk about his political journey within Alaskan politics and legislation in order to bring Native Alaskan issues to the forefront of Alaskan politics

== Personal life ==
Hensley married his wife Abigale Hensley in 1974 and they have four children, Priscilla, Mollie, James, and Elizabeth. Hensley and his wife now live in Anchorage.

Party political offices
Preceded by Steve McAlpine	Democratic nominee for Lieutenant Governor of Alaska; 1990	Succeeded by Fran Ulmer
