= Frank R. Ferguson =

American politician

- Paaraq
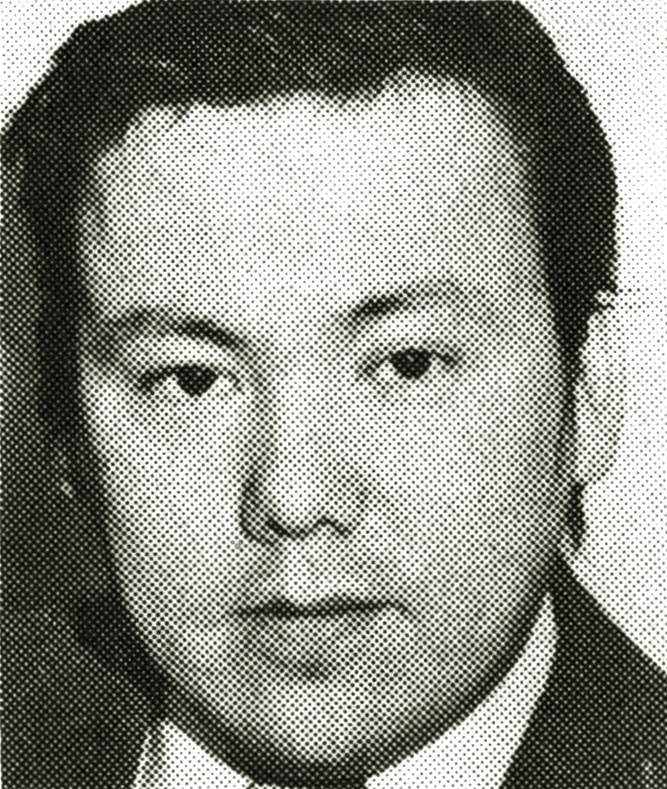
- Ferguson as a state representative in 1973

Member of the Alaska Senate
- In office January 20, 1975 – December 18, 1986
- Preceded by: District created Willie Hensley (District K)
- Succeeded by: Willie Hensley
- Constituency: District P (1975 - 1983); District L (1983 - 1986)

Member of the Alaska House of Representatives
- In office January 11, 1971 – January 20, 1975
- Preceded by: Willie Hensley
- Succeeded by: Brenda Itta
- Constituency: District 17 (1971 - 1973); District 19 (1973 - 1975)

Personal details
- Born: July 14, 1939 Kotzebue, Alaska, United States
- Died: June 4, 2003 (aged 63) Kotzebue, Alaska, United States
- Party: Democratic
- Other political affiliations: Independent (1973-1974)
- Spouse: Sophie Ferguson
- Children: 5

Frank R. Ferguson (July 14, 1939 – June 4, 2003) was an American Iñupiat politician from Alaska who served in the Alaska House of Representatives and the Alaska Senate.

== Early life and education ==
Frank Ferguson was born in Kotzebue, Alaska in 1939. The Fergusons eventually moved to Fairbanks for better access to schooling, where Frank attended Lathrop High School.

== Early career ==
Ferguson served in the United States Army from 1963 to 1965.

== Political career ==
Ferguson served for four years as vice president of the Kotzebue City Council.

=== State Representative ===
Ferguson was a member of the Alaska House of Representatives between 1971 and 1975, representing the Northwest Arctic and the North Slope for two two-year terms. He held the seat previously occupied by his childhood friend Willie Hensley. In 1972, Ferguson lost the Democratic primary in his district to Brenda Itta, but won reelection as a write-in candidate with 51.5% of the vote. As such, during his last term in the House, he was not officially affiliated with any party, though he was a Democrat during his first term and for the rest of his career. Itta would win the seat in 1974.

=== State Senator ===
Ferguson was elected to the Alaska Senate in 1974, once again succeeding Willie Hensley, who represented the same region prior to redistricting. Ferguson served in the Senate for almost 12 years. As a senator, Ferguson was instrumental in securing state funds for rural Alaska, helping to improve rural infrastructure, courts, health services, and education. He also played a key role in establishing the Bush Caucus as a powerful force in the Alaska Legislature.

Ferguson eventually retired after suffering a stroke in 1986. Hensley was appointed to complete his Senate term.

== Personal life and other endeavors ==
In addition to his political offices, Ferguson held leadership positions in various organizations throughout his life, notably serving as president of the Alaska Federation of Natives and chairman of NANA Regional Corporation.

Ferguson was married twice and had five children. His second wife was Sophie Ferguson.

== Later life and death ==
Ferguson suffered another stroke in May of 2000 that left him unable to speak. He died of a stroke in Kotzebue on June 4, 2003 at the age of 63. Governor Frank Murkowski ordered flags lowered to half-staff in Ferguson's honor.

The headquarters of the Maniilaq Association is named the Frank R. Ferguson Building in his honor, and the Northwest Arctic Borough has awarded the Frank R. Ferguson Memorial Scholarship to students from the region since 1988.
