= Thomas Baker (Alaska politician) =

American politician (born 1995)

- Ikaaq
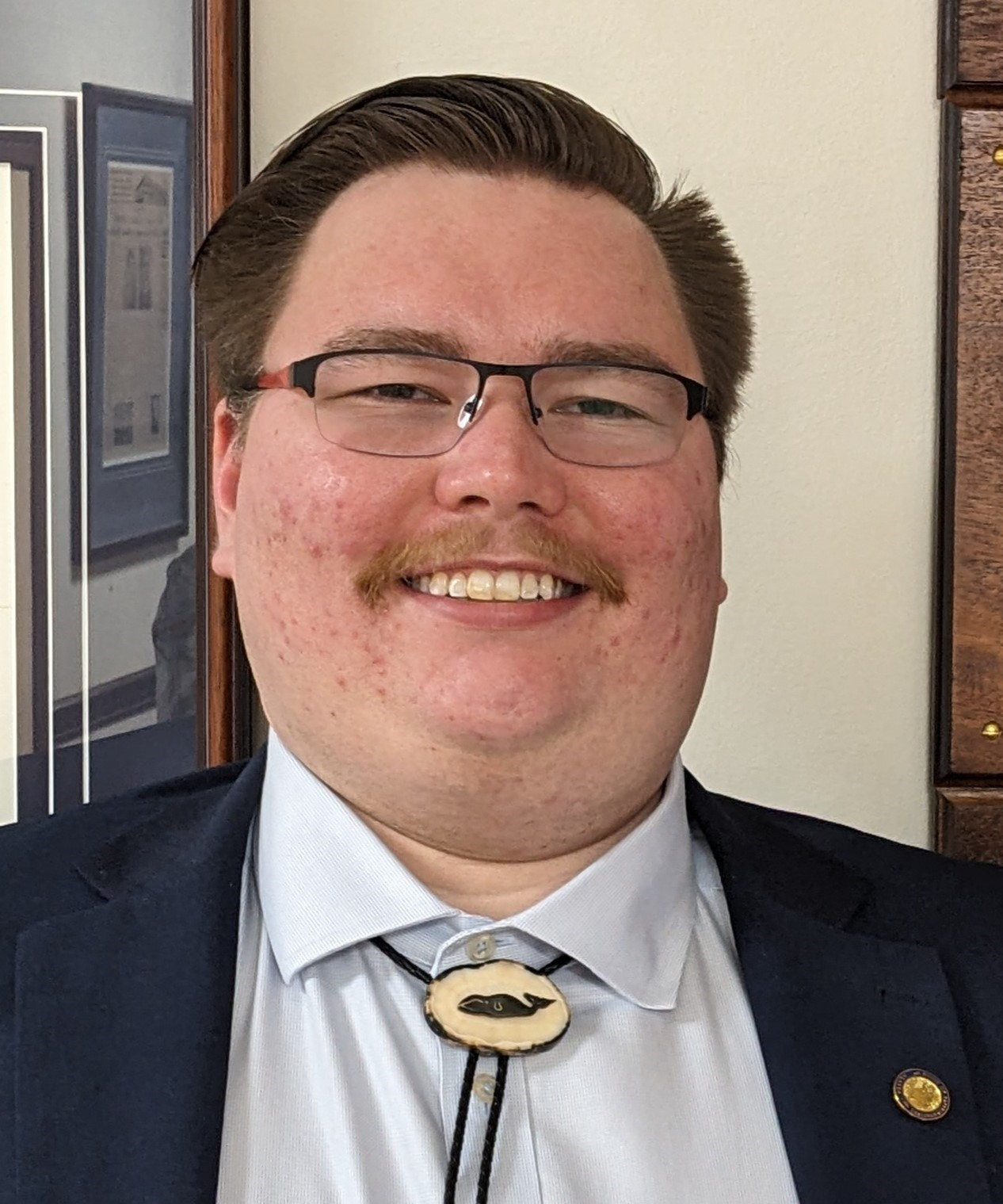
- Baker in 2024

Member of the Alaska House of Representatives from the 40th district
- In office November 13, 2023 – January 21, 2025
- Appointed by: Mike Dunleavy
- Preceded by: Josiah Patkotak
- Succeeded by: Robyn Burke

Personal details
- Born: 1995 (age 30–31) Kotzebue, Alaska, U.S.
- Party: Independent (since 2024)
- Other political affiliations: Republican (before 2024)
- Relatives: John Baker (uncle)
- Education: Dartmouth College (BA)

Thomas C. Baker (Iñupiaq: Ikaaq; born 1995) is an American Iñupiat politician from Alaska who represented District 40 in the Alaska House of Representatives from November 2023 to January 2025.

== Early life and education ==
Baker was born in Kotzebue, Alaska in 1995. He is the son of lobbyist Andy Baker and the nephew of 2011 Iditarod winner John Baker. He graduated from Kotzebue High School in 2013, going on to obtain a bachelor's degree in English from Dartmouth College in 2017.

== Early career ==
At the time of his appointment to the House, Baker was chair of the regional advisory council for the Federal Subsistence Board and working as a construction manager for the Kikiktagruk Inupiat Corporation.

== Political career ==
Baker has served on the Kotzebue city and tribal councils. In 2020, he unsuccessfully ran for the state senate against incumbent Donny Olson.

=== Alaska House of Representatives ===
Baker was appointed on November 8, 2023 by governor Mike Dunleavy to fill the vacancy created by the resignation of Josiah Patkotak, who left the House after being elected as mayor of the North Slope Borough. On November 13, Baker was sworn in after being confirmed by House Republicans.

Baker represented District 40, the northernmost legislative district in the country, making him a member of the Bush Caucus. Baker often voted in opposition to the non-Republican members of the caucus, swinging the outcome of votes on education and causing friction within the group.

In March 2024, the Legislature passed a resolution introduced by Baker urging the withdrawal of a proposed Bureau of Land Management rule restricting development in large portions of the National Petroleum Reserve in Alaska. This resolution was praised by the members of Alaska's congressional delegation.

On March 18, 2024, after several meetings with the governor over the previous week, Baker voted against overriding Governor Dunleavy's veto of a bipartisan education funding bill, citing the need for other funding in his district and the governor's ability to veto specific funding from the budget regardless. Baker had previously voted in favor of the education bill.

Baker proposed an amendment to the Alaska Constitution that would allow the Legislature to establish a preference giving priority to rural subsistence harvesters during resource shortages. The measure could bring Alaska into compliance with the Alaska National Interest Lands Conservation Act, potentially allowing the state government to assume sole fish and game management authority on federal lands in Alaska. This proposal drew support from Alaska Department of Fish and Game commissioner Doug Vincent-Lang, but was criticized Alaska Federation of Natives president Julie Kitka. NANA Corporation and the Maniilaq Association issued a joint statement saying that they could not support the proposal and that Baker had not adequately consulted his constituents.

In 2024, Baker, facing an election challenge from Democratic candidates Saima Chase and Robyn Burke, ran for re-election as an independent. Baker finished third in the election, with Burke winning in the second round.

=== Post-legislature ===
In 2025, Baker ran for a seat on the Northwest Arctic Borough Assembly, but was defeated by former assembly member Carl Nasruk Weisner.

== Electoral history ==
Alaska Senate, District T, Republican primary results, 2020
Party	Candidate	Votes	%
Republican	Thomas Baker	674	60.61
Republican	Calvin Moto II	438	39.39
Total votes		1,112	100.0

Alaska Senate, District T, election results, 2020
Party	Candidate	Votes	%
Democratic	Donny Olson (incumbent)	6,604	65.29
Republican	Thomas Baker	3,422	33.83
Write-in	Write-ins	89	0.88
Total votes		10,115	100.0

Alaska House, District 40, Nonpartisan primary results, 2024
Party	Candidate	Votes	%
Democratic	Saima "Ikrik" Chase	345	35.6
Democratic	Robyn "Niayuq" Burke	342	35.3
Undeclared	Thomas "Ikaaq" Baker (incumbent)	281	29.0
Total votes		968	100.0

2024 Alaska House, District 40, election results, 2024
Party	Candidate	First Choice		Round 1			Round 2	
Party	Candidate	Votes	%	Votes	%	Transfer	Votes	%
Democratic	Robyn "Niayuq" Burke	1,417	46.7%	1,425	46.8%	+116	1,541	60.5%
Democratic	Saima "Ikrik" Chase	863	28.4%	874	28.7%	+134	1,008	39.5%
Undeclared	Thomas "Ikaaq" Baker (incumbent)	731	24.1%	743	24.4%	-743	Eliminated	
Write-in		21	0.7%	Eliminated				
Total votes		3,032		3,042			2,549	
Blank or inactive ballots				128		+493	621	
