= Ambler Road =

Proposed industrial hauling road in Alaska, US

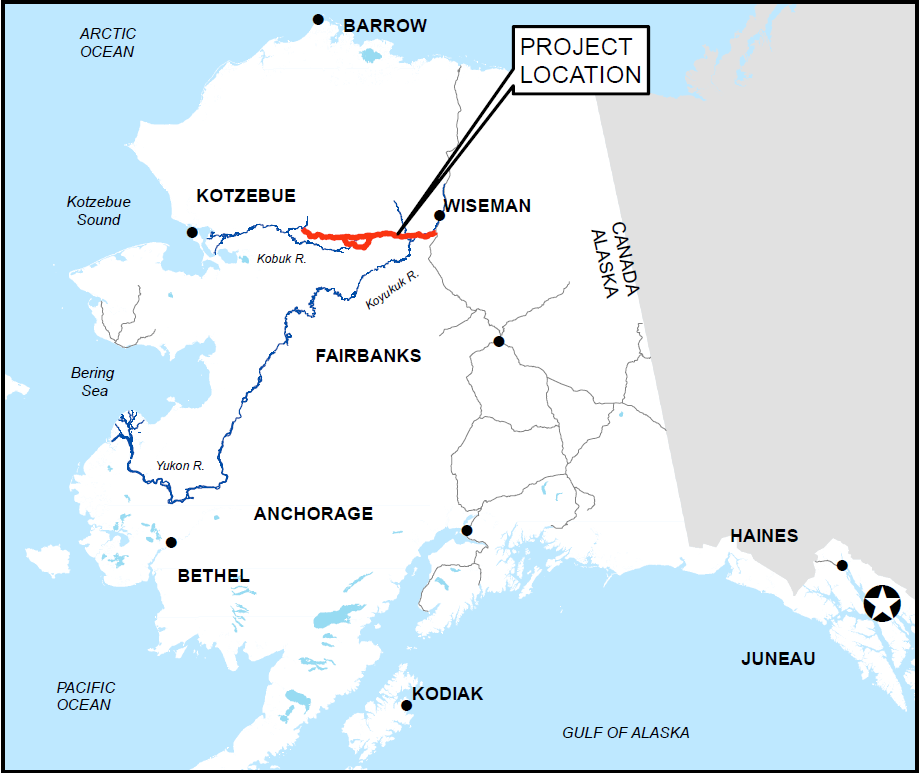
- Proposed route of the road, with an alternative route shown
- Proposed by: Alaska Industrial Development and Export Authority (AIDEA)
- Proposed length: 211 miles

The Ambler Mining District Industrial Access Project is a proposed industrial haul road that would connect the Dalton Highway to the area around the Ambler Mining District, allowing for future mining projects in the area. The project is being managed by the Alaska Industrial Development and Export Authority (AIDEA)—Alaska's state-owned economic development authority.

Concerns have been raised due to its potential impact on the environment and Alaska Native communities. In April 2024, the Bureau of Land Management (BLM) issued a Supplemental Environmental Impact Statement (SEIS) evaluating the project's potential impact on the environment and nearby communities. The BLM selected the "no action" alternative, effectively halting the project.

In January 2025, US President Donald Trump ordered the suspension of the SEIS and the reinstatement of an earlier Environmental Impact Statement, once again opening the door for the project to move forward. Trump signed an order approving project construction on October 6, 2025.

== Description ==
The road would start at milepost 161 on the Dalton Highway, near the towns of Wiseman and Coldfoot. It will cross over 3,000 streams and several rivers, requiring up to 50 different bridge projects. The route will also include aid stations, airstrips, turnouts, and culverts before ending at the proposed mining site near the town of Ambler. The planned road would consist of a gravel strip and is envisioned as a toll road with no public access. Construction costs would be covered through user fees, similar to the AIDEA-funded DeLong Mountain Transportation System, which provides a port for lead and zinc exports from the Red Dog Mine, Alaska.

== History ==
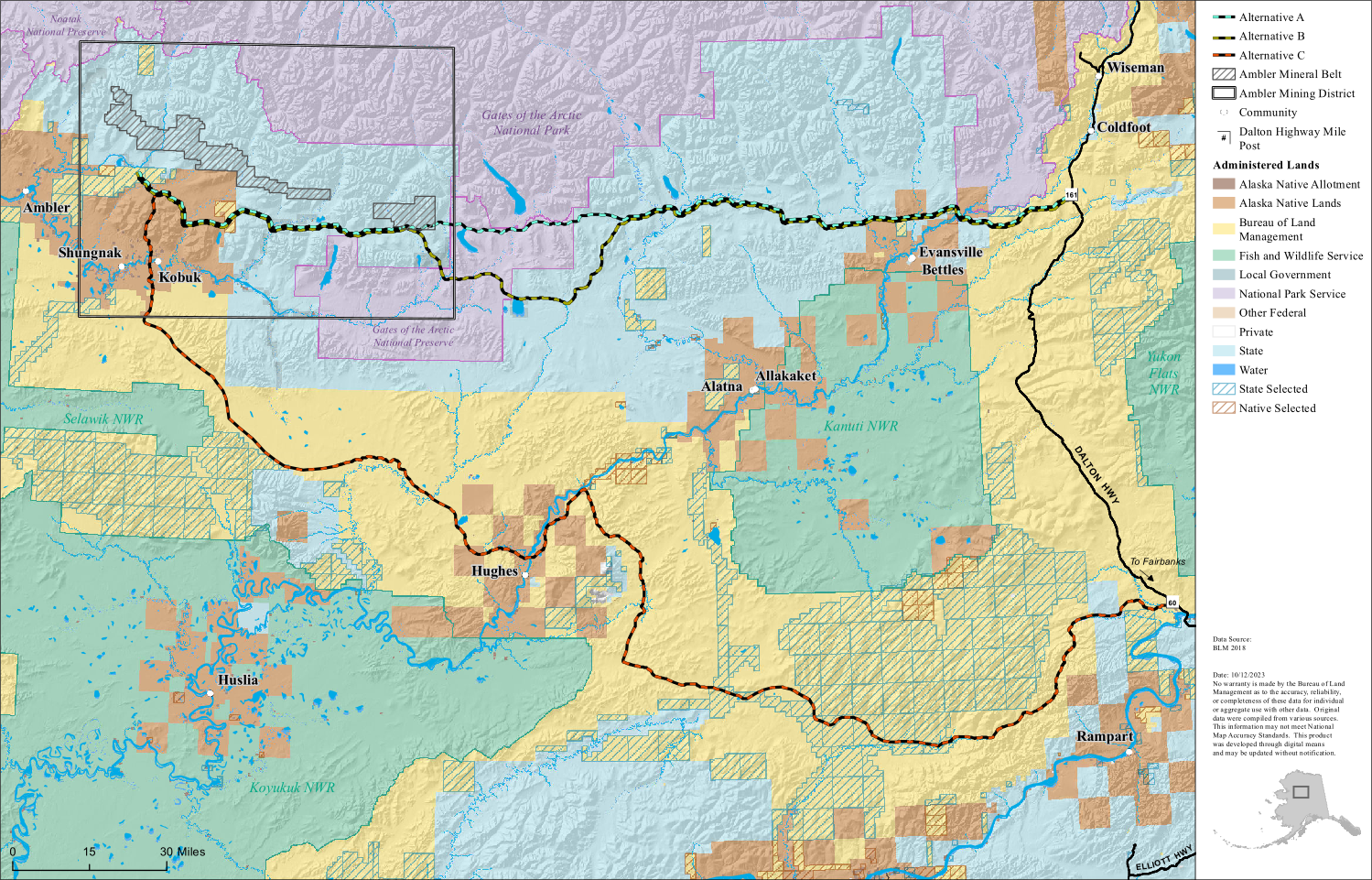
Land administration/ownership in the project area as of 2023 (Alternative A is the originally proposed route)

The Ambler Mineral Belt contains valuable deposits of copper, cobalt, and other minerals. After access to the area by rail or barge was determined to be unfeasible, the Alaska Department of Transportation and Public Facilities began working toward building a road. This project was transferred to AIDEA in 2013.

The 1980 Alaska National Interest Lands Conservation Act required the National Park Service to grant right-of-way access through Gates of the Arctic National Park to a road providing access to the Ambler Mining District. However, as the proposed road would have to pass through areas managed by the BLM, it was still subject to environmental review under the National Environmental Policy Act.

On February 11, 2020, Ambler Metals LLC was formed to pursue mining projects in the Ambler Mining District. The company is a joint venture between Trilogy Metals and South32, with each company holding a 50% stake.

In 2020, the BLM released its Environmental Impact Statement (EIS) on the proposal, selecting AIDEA's proposed 211-mile route as its preferred alternative. This conclusion was challenged in court by environmental and tribal groups, leading the BLM to begin work on a broader Supplemental Environmental Impact Statement (SEIS) that would address shortcomings in the initial EIS.

In October 2023, Doyon, Limited announced that it would not renew its land-use agreement with AIDEA once it expired in April 2024, blocking access to 10–12 miles of two potential routes for the Ambler Road, as well as gravel pits needed for road construction. This action was due at least in part to a dispute between Doyon and AIDEA regarding a separate project.

The Draft Supplemental Environmental Impact Statement was released in late 2023 and concluded that 66 communities would see their subsistence practices negatively impacted by the project instead of the 27 included in the initial EIS. The SEIS was finalized in April 2024, with the BLM this time selecting "no action" as its preferred alternative. This decision was announced at the same time as new restrictions on development within the National Petroleum Reserve in Alaska were finalized. BLM's decision drew criticism from industry groups, the Alaska state government, and Alaska's congressional delegation.

NANA Regional Corporation announced in May 2024 that it would not renew its land use agreement with AIDEA. NANA stated that it disagreed with AIDEA's management of the Ambler Road project, but continued to support future mine development and would maintain its partnership with Ambler Metals.

In June 2024, Alaska Senator Dan Sullivan added a rider to the National Defense Authorization Act for Fiscal Year 2025 that would have required the BLM to grant the Ambler Access Project right-of-way within 30 days of the act's passage, citing national security interests. Sullivan's amendment was not included in the legislation's final version.

Advocates of the project expected it to have a better chance of winning federal approval under the second Trump administration, and Project 2025 called for the government to "immediately approve" the Ambler Road. Trilogy Metals stock increased in value after the 2024 presidential election.

On January 15, 2025, the Biden Administration directed the United States Army Corps of Engineers to revoke the project's Clean Water Act permits, but this process was not completed for unclear reasons, leaving the permits merely suspended.

Just days later, President Donald Trump, on the day of his second inauguration, signed Executive Order 14153, titled "Unleashing Alaska's Extraordinary Resource Potential", which among other things, ordered the suspension of the 2024 SEIS pending review, along with the reinstatement of the 2020 EIS. Despite this, the project is still expected to face significant procedural and legal hurdles. Trump signed an executive order calling to increase American mineral production in March 2025.

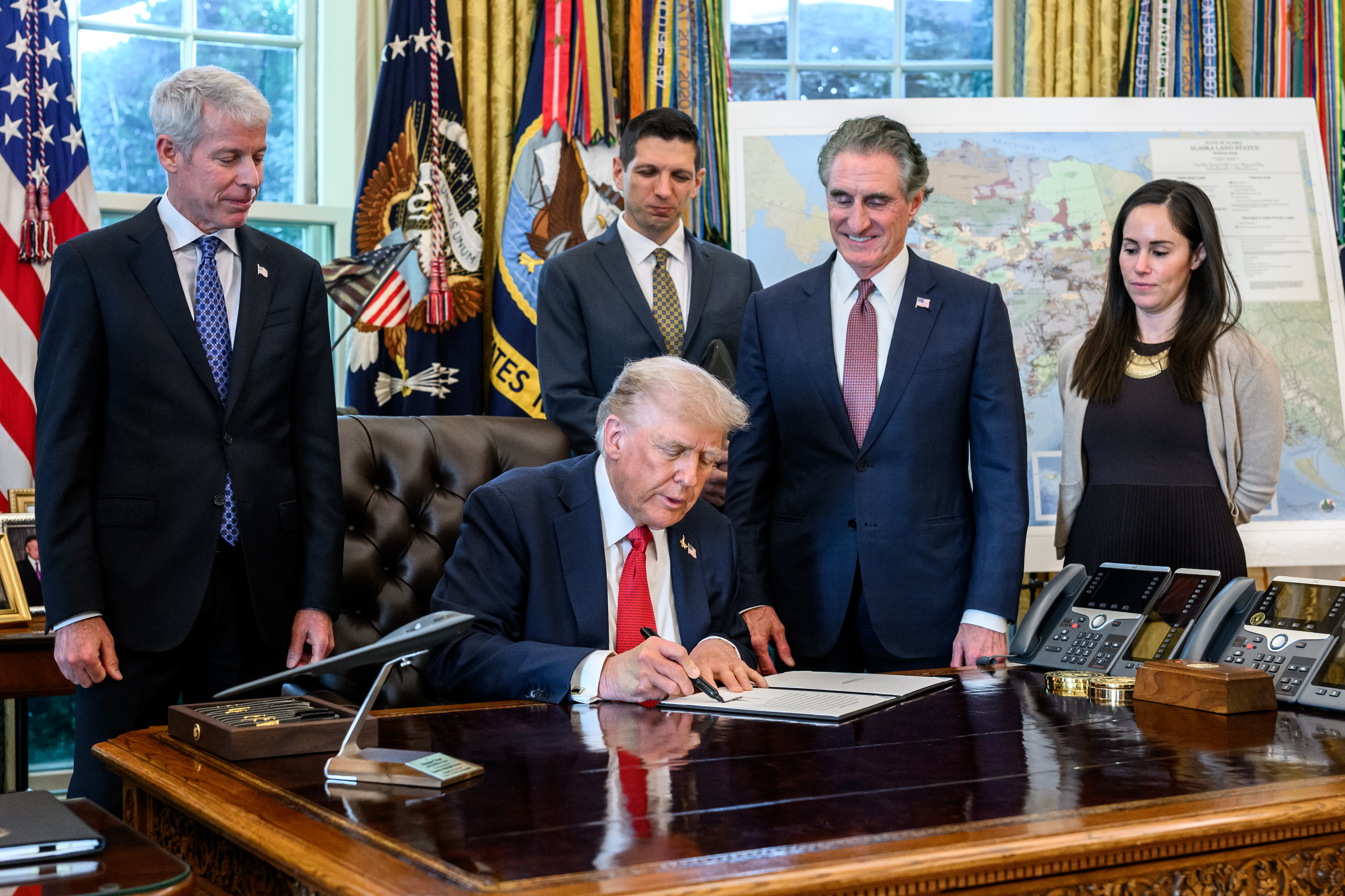
President Donald Trump signs an executive order approving the project on October 6, 2025

On October 6, 2025 Trump signed an executive order approving project construction. He also announced a $35.6 million purchase of a 10% share in Trilogy Metals to mine minerals in the region.

In December 2025, the Alaska state government signed a new agreement with Doyon and NANA, indicating that the Alaska Native corporations could be open to allowing the road to be built across their lands. The terms of the agreement, which were not released until February 2026, included assurances that the road would be private, the establishment of a special entity to manage the project, the establishment of a subsistence committee that would include local residents, and the possibility of constructing spur roads to nearby villages. The agreement is nonbinding, but could set the stage for a future binding agreement. NANA stated that the agreement did not change its formal position on the project.

== Reactions ==
=== Arguments against the project ===
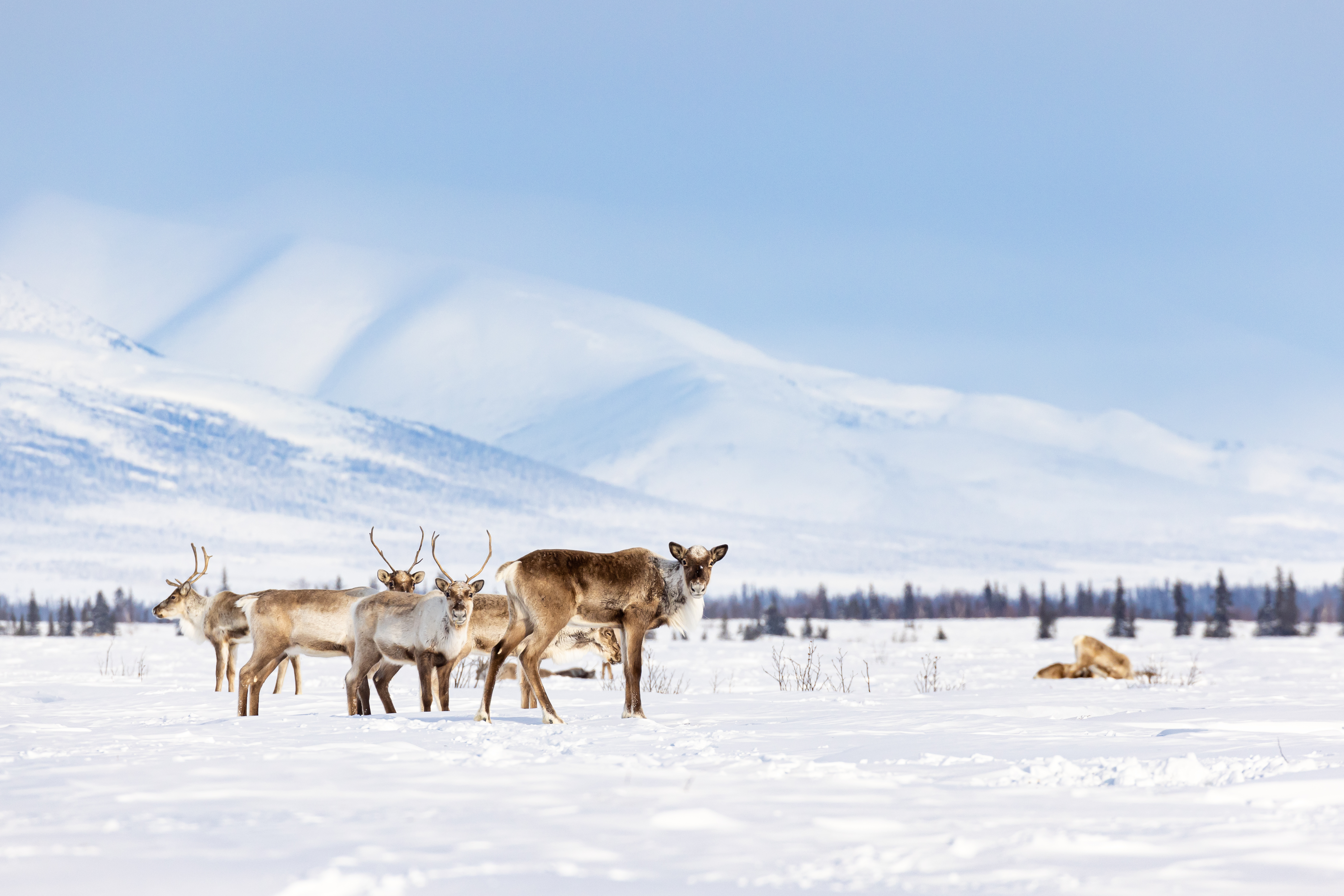
A group of caribou from the Western Arctic Herd, which migrates through the region

Opponents of the project have cited the potential negative impacts on the regional environment, culture, and subsistence practices from the road itself and subsequent mining projects. A 2024 Bureau of Land Management Record of Decision, in cooperation with Alaska tribal councils, the Environmental Protection Agency, and the Fish and Wildlife Service highlighted the project's impact on the traditional practices of Alaska Native communities, the Western Arctic caribou herd, fish habitats, water and air quality, disruption of groundwater, and hazardous materials from spills as reasons for denying the project. Some research has shown that other roads in the region—including the DeLong Mountain Transportation System—can significantly delay caribou migrations, even with levels of traffic lower than the proposed Ambler Road. There has also been concern that the road could be opened to the public—as happened with the Dalton Highway—potentially allowing outside hunters and bootleggers to more easily access the region.

A group of regional residents called Protect the Kobuk has organized opposition to the road in the Northwest Arctic Borough.

In addition to Protect the Kobuk, several notable organizations have publicly opposed the project, including the Tanana Chiefs Conference, the Sierra Club, the Center for American Progress, and numerous other environmental and Alaska Native organizations. Former Alaska congresswoman Mary Peltola also opposes the road, though she had previously joined the other members of Alaska's congressional delegation in supporting it. California representative Jared Huffman, a ranking member of the House Natural Resources Committee opposes the project, saying: "Trump is sidestepping the views of Native Alaskans and short circuiting the federal government’s obligation to hear from them."

=== Arguments for the project ===
Supporters of the Ambler Access Project have cited its potential to bring jobs and economic growth to the region. They have also pointed out that the minerals that could be extracted from the Ambler Region would aid the nation's transition to clean energy and electric vehicles. Supporters have warned that if mining projects in the United States are blocked, the same minerals will have to be sourced from countries with weaker protections for human rights and the environment.

Supporters include Alaska governor Mike Dunleavy, Alaska congressman Nick Begich III, and Alaska's two Senators—Lisa Murkowski and Dan Sullivan. The project is also supported by mining industry groups, some Alaska Native groups, and the Northwest Arctic and North Slope borough governments.

== See also ==
- Red Dog Mine
- Pebble Mine
- Willow Project
