= Maniilaq =

Iñupiat mythical figure

Maniiḷaq (English: /məˈniːlək/; Inupiaq: [mɐniːʎɑq]) is a figure of Iñupiat legend and history. He lived in the 19th century before colonialists arrived in his area of northwest Alaska. He lived as a hunter and a healer in northwest Alaska. Various stories about him include that he heard voices predicting that people would come to Alaska, that he had prophetic visions of boats that were propelled by fire or that flew in the air, and that he heard voices from a higher power who he said identified as abba (Father & Son). Some also say that Maniiḷaq rested every seventh day. Other prophecies attributed to Maniiḷaq include the prophecy that the village of Ambler, Alaska would one day become a large metropolis, and that a whale would swim upriver and appear at Ambler. It is said that Maniiḷaq practiced traditional medicine, and also that he resisted the dominant cultural order of shamanism. He is an important figure in Northwest Alaska Christian communities. The most distant future event he predicted was a day that was split in two.

Maniiḷaq is also used as the symbol for a tribally-operated health and social services organization based in Kotzebue, Alaska. Maniilaq Association runs the Maniiḷaq Health Center in Kotzebue, which includes a hospital, clinic, and public health services, as well as clinics in 11 outlying arctic villages, including Ambler, Buckland, Deering, Kiana, Kivalina, Kobuk, Noatak, Noorvik, Selawik, Shungnak and Pt. Hope. These clinics are staffed by trained Community Health Aides.
