= NANA Development Corporation =

NANA Development Corporation headquartered in Anchorage, Alaska, was owned by NANA Regional Corporation—an Alaska Native Corporation formed under provisions of the Alaska Native Claims Settlement Act (ANSCA)—and functioned as the latter's business arm.

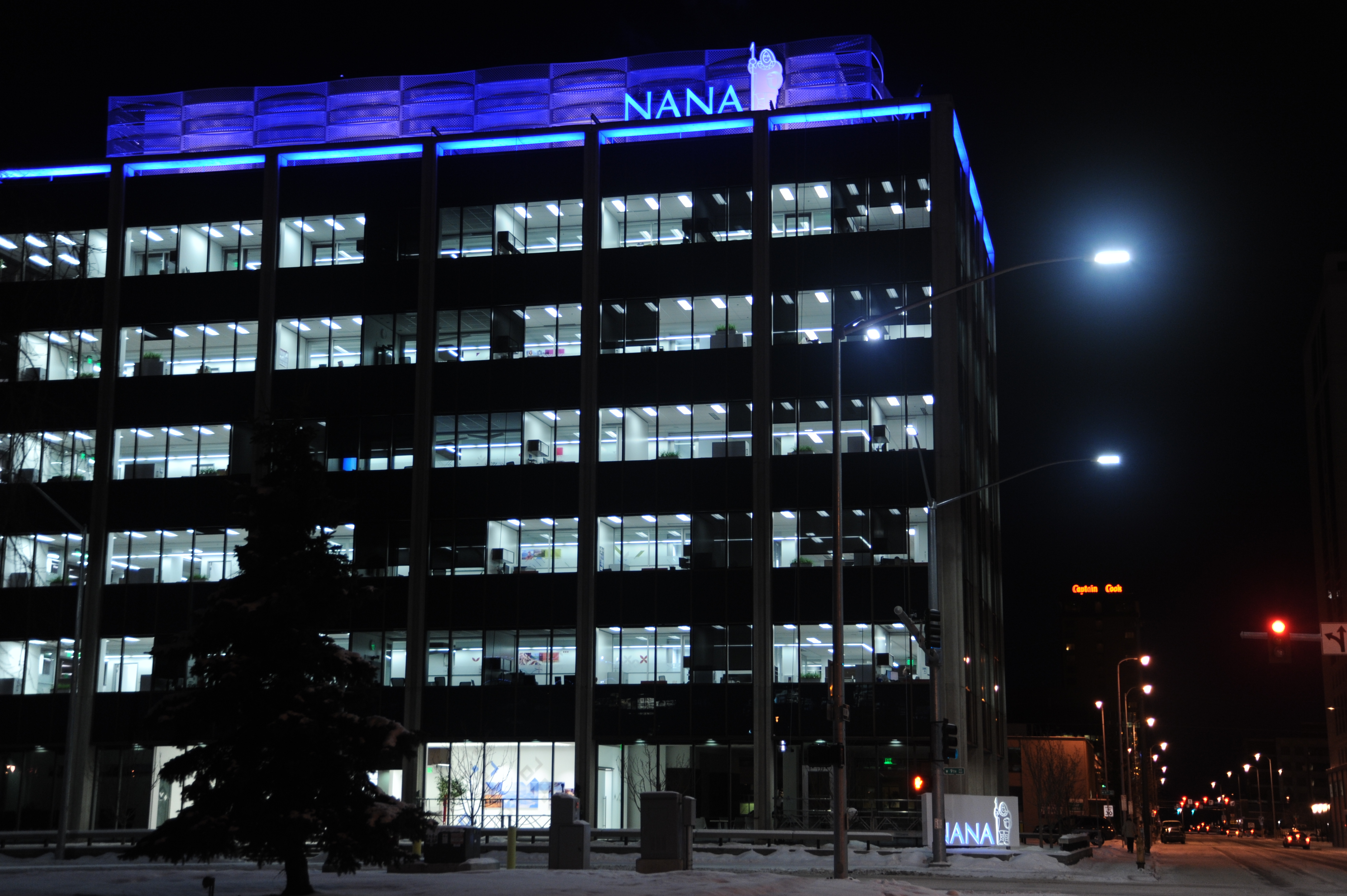
NANA Development Corporation headquarters are adjacent to the Delaney Park Strip in downtown Anchorage. The building, constructed in 1969, previously housed oil company offices.

== History ==
In 1968, nine years after Alaska attained statehood, oil was discovered at Prudhoe Bay. The discovery put the issue of Native lands into the forefront. Three years later, in 1971 President Richard Nixon signed the Alaska Native Claims Settlement Act, which conveyed nearly 150 million acres (610,000 km^{2}) of federal land into the hands of 12 newly created Alaska Native regional corporations. One of these corporations was NANA Regional Corporation. In 1974, NANA Development Corporation was founded to function as the business arm of NANA Regional Corporation.

In November 2017, the company's subsidiary, Akima LLC, fired one of its employees, Juli Briskman, after a news photographer caught her giving the finger to the presidential motorcade of Donald Trump as it passed by her. She is not identifiable in the photo, but after it went viral she posted it on her social media accounts and voluntarily identified herself to the company's human resources department that she is the person in it. Four months after being fired, she sued the company for wrongful termination and for additional severance pay. In the 2019 Virginia elections, Briskman was elected to the board of supervisors for Loudoun County, Virginia.

== NANA Regional Corporation ==
NANA Regional Corporation, headquartered in Kotzebue, Alaska, is an Alaska Native Corporation with a land base of approximately 36,000 square miles (roughly the size of Indiana) in Northwest Alaska centered on the Kotzebue Sound and its tributaries. The Arctic Circle travels through NANA territory. NANA Regional Corporation is the owner of NANA Development Corporation. There are approximately 13,000 shareholders of NANA Regional Corporation, most of whom are of Inupiat descent. About 7,300 residents live in this area, more than 85 percent of whom are NANA shareholders. Unlike traditional corporate shares, NANA Regional Corporation shares are not publicly traded, nor can they be bought or sold.

== Current enterprises ==
NANA Development Corporation employed approximately 15,000 employees in all 50 US states and in nine countries. It worked primarily in the oil and gas, mining, technology, hospitality, healthcare, construction, federal contracting and tribal sectors of the economy.

NANA Development Corporation and some of its majority-owned subsidiaries qualify under federal law as "minority and economically disadvantaged business enterprise[s]" and therefore meet the requirements of the Small Business Administration's 8(a) contracting provisions.

NANA Development Corporation earned corporate revenues of $1.7 billion in 2013. Examples of some of the more than 30 companies NANA owns, or owns a stake in, are listed below.

=== Oil and gas ===
NANA provides support for oilfield and natural gas operations and associated services. Subsidiaries in the petroleum sector include the following:

- NANA Major Drilling, based in Salt Lake City, Utah, which specializes in drilling services for shallow gas and coal bed methane.
- NANA Oilfield Services, based in Anchorage, Alaska, provides oilfield support services to companies working on Alaska's North Slope.
- NANA WorleyParsons, based in Anchorage, Alaska, specializes in engineering, design and project management in the petroleum sector.

=== Motion pictures ===
NANA invests in the Alaska-based motion picture industry:

- Evergreen Films, NANA invests in Evergreen Films, an Anchorage and Los Angeles-based motion picture company.
- Piksik, based in Anchorage, Alaska, is a support services company specializing in film, TV, digital content and print ad production support.

=== Mining ===
Red Dog Mine, the largest zinc mine in the world, is located on land owned by NANA north of the Arctic Circle and is developed by NANA in partnership with Teck Cominco. Other NANA subsidiaries which serve the mining sector include:

- Paa River Construction, based in Anchorage, Alaska, a construction and support firm that primarily serves activities at the Red Dog Mine.
- NANA Lynden Logistics, based in Anchorage, Alaska, which provides transportation and logistical services in the mining sector, primarily at Red Dog Mine.
- NANA Major Drilling (see above)
- NOSI, based in Anchorage, Alaska, is the only full-service Chevron Distributor on the North Slope.
- Tuuq, based in Anchorage, Alaska, was established to provide drilling services to that area.

=== Hospitality ===
- Pegasus Aircraft Maintenance Services, based in Anchorage, Alaska, provides aircraft maintenance and ground support services at the Ted Stevens Anchorage International Airport, in Anchorage, Alaska.
- NMS, based in Anchorage, Alaska, provides food service and hotel management, including six owned and or operated hotels in Anchorage, Fairbanks and Kotzebue.

=== Technology services, healthcare and contracting ===
- Akima Management Services, based in Charlotte, North Carolina, is a company that provides services in the healthcare industry, technology industry and to the federal government.
- Kuna Engineering, based in Anchorage, Alaska, offers engineering, planning and architectural services throughput Alaska.
- Five Rivers Services, based in Colorado Springs, Colorado, provides C4ISR services to the Department of defense and other federal government agencies.
- Truestone, based in Herndon, Virginia, is an IT service provider to federal government agencies and commercial customers.

== See also ==
- Alaska Native Claims Settlement Act
- Alaska Native Regional Corporations
