= Adam Stennett =

American painter (born 1972)

Adam Stennett (born 1972 in Kotzebue, Alaska) is an internationally exhibited American painter based in Brooklyn, New York best known for his hyperrealist works. He was raised in Oregon and received his Bachelor of Arts degree in from Willamette University in Salem. For several years he was the assistant to the painter Damian Loeb. His work has been the subject of three solo exhibitions at the gallery 31Grand in 2004, 2005 and 2007. In 2013, his outdoor installation transferred indoors a.k.a. his "Survival Shack" was the basis for an exhibition at the Glenn Horowitz Bookseller space in East Hampton, New York and received widespread press coverage.
