= Seth Kantner =

American writer from the state of Alaska

- Education: University of Alaska; University of Montana
- Occupation: Writer
- Writing career
- Notable awards: Whiting Award (2005)
- Website: sethkantner.com

Seth Kantner is an American writer from the state of Alaska who has attended the University of Alaska and studied journalism at the University of Montana. He has worked as a photographer, trapper, fisherman, mechanic and igloo-builder and now lives in Kotzebue, Alaska. His 2004 novel Ordinary Wolves tells the story of Cutuk, a boy who, like the author, was raised and home-schooled in a sod igloo on the Alaskan tundra. The book was published by Milkweed Editions and won a Pacific Northwest Booksellers Award. He followed it in 2009 with a memoir, also from Milkweed, Shopping for Porcupine.

== Awards ==
- 2005 Whiting Award for nonfiction
- 2017 Whiting Creative Nonfiction Grant to complete his book A Thousand Trails Home
