= Robyn Frier =

American politician (born 1991)

- Niayuq

Member of the Alaska House of Representatives from the 40th district
- Incumbent
- Assumed office January 21, 2025
- Preceded by: Thomas Baker

Personal details
- Born: 1991 (age 34–35) Barrow, Alaska
- Party: Democratic Party
- Education: Mt. Edgecumbe High School
- Occupation: Human resources administrator

Robyn Niayuq Frier (formerly Burke; born 1991) is an American politician and member of the Alaska House of Representatives from the 40th district, which includes the North Slope Borough and Northwest Arctic Borough. A Democrat, she defeated incumbent Thomas Baker in 2024. The district is the size of Germany, and is the northernmost legislative district in the United States. She was previously the president of the North Slope Borough School District Board of Education. In the campaign, issues included water use and wealth inequality.

Frier is Alaska Native of Iñupiaq descent.

== Electoral history ==
=== 2024 ===
==== Primary ====
2024 Nonpartisan primary
Party	Candidate	Votes	%
Democratic	Saima "Ikrik" Chase	345	35.6
Democratic	Robyn "Niayuq" Burke	342	35.3
Independent	Thomas "Ikaaq" Baker (incumbent)	281	29.0
Total votes		968	100.0

==== General ====
2024 Alaska House of Representatives General Election, district 40
Party	Candidate	First Choice		Round 1			Round 2	
Party	Candidate	Votes	%	Votes	%	Transfer	Votes	%
Democratic	Robyn "Niayuq" Burke	1,417	46.7%	1,425	46.8%	+116	1,541	60.5%
Democratic	Saima "Ikrik" Chase	863	28.4%	874	28.7%	+134	1,008	39.5%
Undeclared	Thomas "Ikaaq" Baker (incumbent)	731	24.1%	743	24.4%	-743	Eliminated	
Write-in		21	0.7%	Eliminated				
Total votes		3,032		3,042			2,549	
Blank or inactive ballots				128		+493	621	

== See also ==
- List of Native American politicians
- Native American women in politics
