= Red Dog mine =

Mine in Alaska, United States

Red Dog Mine
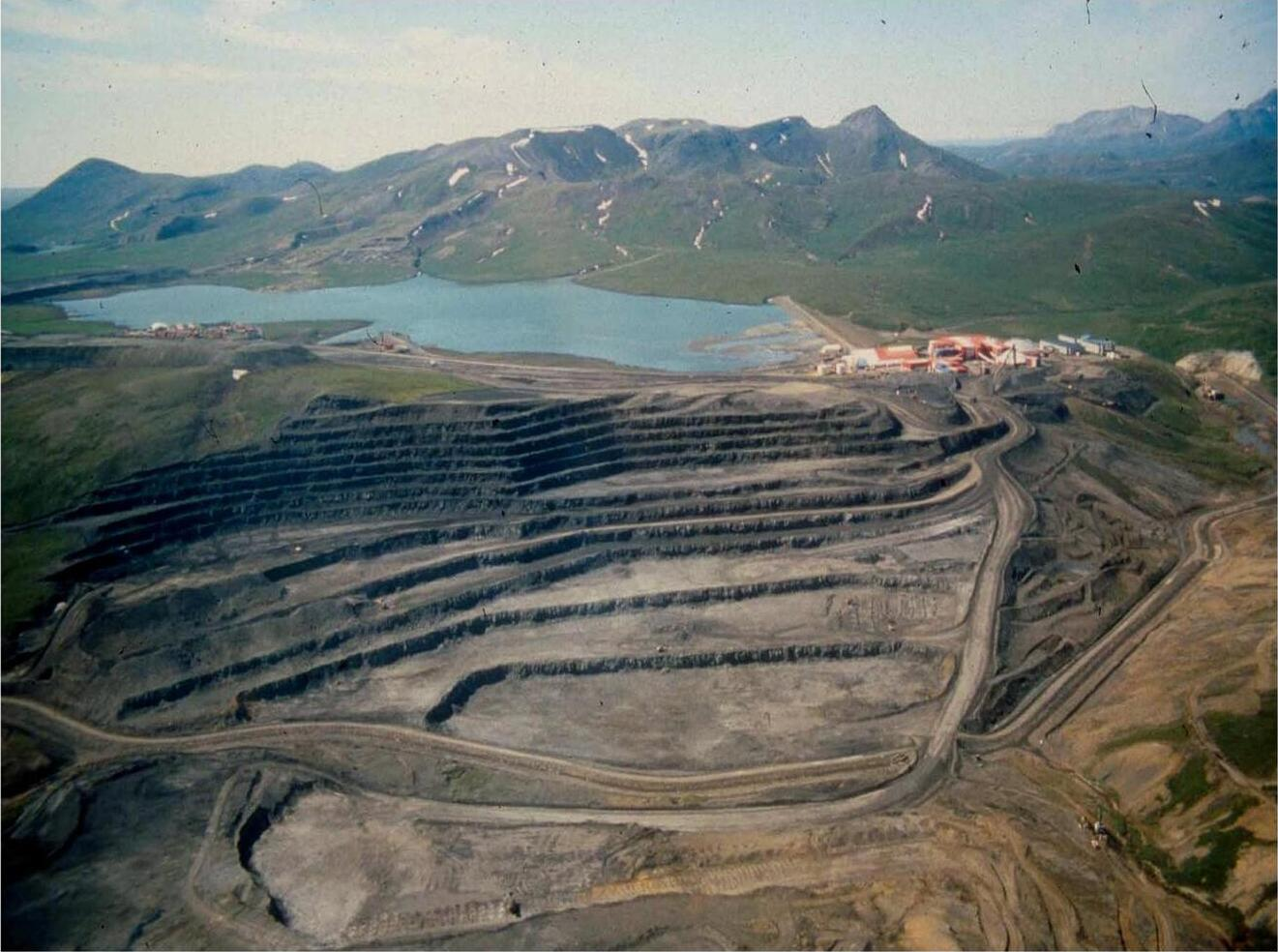
- The mine around 2006

- Location in Alaska
- Location: Red Dog Mine, Northwest Arctic Borough, Alaska, United States; 68°04′19″N 162°52′34″W
- Products: Zinc, lead, silver
- Production: 557,000 long tons (624,000 short tons) of zinc (Note: Long ton—imperial ton or displacement ton—refers to the unit called the "ton" in the Imperial system of measurements equals 2,204.6 pounds. In the metric system, one Tonne—metric ton—equals 1000 kilograms or 1 megagram (1 t = 1000 kg = 1 Mg). The metric ton equals 2,204.6 pounds, 1.102 short tons (US) or approximately 0.984 long tons (UK). See MSC Archived 2017-07-24 at the Wayback Machine)
- Financial year: 2006
- Opened: 1989
- Closed: currently operating
- Company: NANA Regional Corporation
- Website: http://www.reddogalaska.com/

The Red Dog mine is a large zinc and lead mine located in the CDP of Red Dog Mine, part of the Northwest Arctic Borough of the U.S. state of Alaska. Located about 80 miles (130 km) north of Kotzebue, the facility is operated by the Canadian mining company Teck Resources on land owned by the NANA Regional Corporation.

The mine is the world's largest producer of zinc and has the world's largest zinc reserves. Red Dog accounts for 10% of the world's zinc production. Red Dog accounted for 66% of the mineral value produced in Alaska in 2018. In 2008 the mine produced 515,200 tonnes (507,100 long tons; 567,900 short tons) of zinc, 122,600 tonnes (120,700 long tons; 135,100 short tons) of lead, and 283 tonnes (9,100,000 ozt) of silver, for a total metal value of over one billion dollars. At the end of 2008 the mine had reserves of 61,400,000 tonnes (60,400,000 long tons; 67,700,000 short tons) of zinc at a grade of 17.1% and lead at a grade of 4.5%, as well as significant additional zinc and lead in the less well-measured resource category.

According to a 2007 EPA report, the mine, which produces from an open pit, was mining the Aqqaluk ore body, immediately adjacent to the previous pit. Aqqaluk contains an additional 56 million metric tons (62 million short tons) of lead and zinc ore. The expansion was expected to keep the mine operating until 2031.

== Location ==
Red Dog is located on land owned by the for-profit NANA Regional Corporation (NANA)—one of thirteen Alaska Native Regional Corporations created under the Alaska Native Claims Settlement Act of 1971 (ANCSA) as part of the settlement of Alaska Native land claims. NANA's land base in the Kotzebue area in northwest Alaska. NANA's Alaska Native shareholders are of Inupiat descent. The mine is operated by the Canadian giant mining company Teck Resources in partnership with NANA Development Corporation. Ore concentrate taken from the mine is trucked westward on the Red Dog Mine Haul Road to the state-owned but Teck Resources-operated DeLong Mountain Port facilities on the Chukchi Sea, where it is stored until the shipping season.

The Iñupiaq villages of Kivalina with a population of 377, and Noatak with 428 inhabitants, are the nearest permanent settlements to the mine.

== History ==
In the mid-1950s, Bob Baker, a local bush pilot and prospector, noticed red-stained creeks in the area, but was unable to land his plane nearby. In 1968, at Baker's urging, a U.S. Geological Survey geologist sampled rocks and stream sediments in the region, including samples from the future site of the Red Dog mine, and named Red Dog Creek after Bob Baker's dog, an Irish Terrier (Tailleur; USGS Open File 70-319). In the mid-1970s, after investigations by BLM-contracted geologists confirmed significant mineralization, interest in the region from major mining companies and NANA intensified. Significant exploration, soon including drilling, of deposits in the region began in 1975 (Alaska Minerals Yearbook 1978–1979).

In 1980 the Alaska National Interest Lands Conservation Act (ANILCA) became law and NANA officially selected the land underlying Red Dog. Drill exploration of the Red Dog deposit began in 1980, by Cominco American. In 1982 NANA and Cominco American (a mining company that had staked the land, and later became Teck Cominco) signed an agreement to develop the deposit.

In 1986 the State of Alaska agreed to fund and take ownership of a road (DeLong Mts. Transportation System) from Red Dog to the coast, and a shallow-water port site. Also in 1986, residents of Kotzebue and 10 other area villages voted to form the Northwest Arctic Borough, to be economically based on taxing the Red Dog mine. Construction of the road, port site, and mine began in July 1987. Mine operations commenced in December 1989.

== Background ==
The Red Dog lead-zinc mine is operated by Teck Resources, a giant Canadian mining company that was associated with Cominco since 1986, "when Teck and two industry partners acquired a shareholding from CP Limited". Teck and Cominco completed their merger in July 2001. The Red Dog mine operator was first called Cominco Alaska, Inc., a subsidiary of Cominco American.

The mine, which is the largest lead-zinc mine in the world, is located in a remote region of northwestern arctic Alaska. The land is owned by the for-profit NANA Regional Corporation (NANA)—one of thirteen Alaska Native Regional Corporations created under the Alaska Native Claims Settlement Act of 1971 (ANCSA) in settlement of Alaska Native land claims. NANA's land base in the Kotzebue area in northwest Alaska. NANA's Alaska Native shareholders are of Inupiat descent.

The U.S. Geological Survey (USGS) first investigated the veins of ore in 1968, at the urging of a local bush pilot and prospector, Bob Baker, who noticed red-stained creeks in the area in the mid-1950s. A USGS geologist sampled rocks and stream sediments in the region, including samples from the future site of the Red Dog mine, and named Red Dog Creek after Bob Baker's dog, an Irish Terrier (Tailleur; USGS Open File 70-319). In the mid-1970s, after investigations by BLM-contracted geologists confirmed significant mineralization, interest in the region from major mining companies and NANA intensified. Significant exploration, including drilling of deposits in the region, began in 1975.

In 1980 the Alaska National Interest Lands Conservation Act (ANILCA) became law and NANA officially selected the land underlying Red Dog. Drill exploration of the Red Dog deposit began in 1980, by Cominco American. In 1982 NANA and Cominco American (a mining company that had staked the land, and later became Teck Cominco) signed an agreement to develop the deposit. In 1986 the State of Alaska agreed to fund and take ownership of a road (DeLong Mts. Transportation System) from Red Dog to the coast, and a shallow-water port site. Also in 1986, residents of Kotzebue and 10 other area villages voted to form the Northwest Arctic Borough, to be economically based on taxing the Red Dog mine. Construction of the road, port site, and mine began in July 1987. Mine operations commenced in December 1989.

== Economics ==
Under the terms of the Teck Cominco/NANA agreement, NANA received royalties of 4.5% until the capital costs of the mine were recovered, which occurred in late 2007. At this point, the royalty due to NANA increased to 25%, and will increase by an additional 5% every year, to a maximum of 50%. Under the terms of the Alaska Native Claims Settlement Act of 1971 (ANSCA), which created NANA and the other native corporations in Alaska, NANA must share approximately half of its profits from natural resources with the other eleven land-based regional native corporations. If the mine remains profitable at the current level, this will mean a distribution of several hundred million dollars a year of mine profits to the regional native corporations.

== Geology ==
The Red Dog area has the world's largest known zinc deposits, which include the four at Red Dog as well as Anarraaq and Su-Lik, respectively 10 and 18 km (6 and 11 mi) northwest. They are stratiform massive sulfide bodies hosted in Carboniferous black shale and altered carbonates. Mesozoic mountain-building tectonic events (i.e. the Brookian orogeny that built the Brooks Range) deformed and thrust faulted the sedimentary strata that host the deposits and the deposits themselves. Subsequent uplift and erosion exposed parts of the deposits at today's earth surface.

Red Dog is an example of a sediment-hosted Zn-Pb-Ag deposit, with the zinc-lead ore considered to have been deposited on the sea floor as a stratum of sulfide sediment. Zinc, lead, silver, and barium were deposited in black muds and carbonates on or beneath the seafloor, in a deep quiet ocean basin, some 338 million years ago in the Mississippian period.

Fluids probably percolated through a huge mass (hundreds of square kilometers) of sediments. The nature of the fluids caused them to absorb and concentrate trace amounts of zinc and lead contained in the rocks the fluids were passing through. These metals were then caused to precipitate, by chemical or biological or physical agents, from the fluid onto or into the seafloor to form the Red Dog deposits.

One model holds that very saline brines formed in a restricted ocean basin within a hundred kilometers of the site of the Red Dog deposits. The brine fluid infiltrated the subsurface and was tectonically pumped through the rock mass, becoming enriched in metals as it stripped those metals from the rocks it passed through. The fluid traveled several kilometers below the earth's surface. The fluid eventually reemerged through fault systems focused on the location of the Red Dog deposits, in a manner somewhat similar to the process surrounding black smokers.

== Reserves and resources (2007) ==
According to a 2007 article in the Alaska Journal of Commerce—at that time—there were several ore bodies that contained zinc at Red Dog. The main pit ore body had 19.5 million metric tons (21.5 million short tons)of ore containing 20.5% zinc. The figures represent the orebody before mining began in 1989. This is the currently permitted area of active mining, which is expected to be mined out by 2012. The ultimate size of this pit will be 5,200 by 3,000 by 400 feet (1,580 m × 910 m × 120 m) deep. The Aqqaluk ore body with 55.7 million tonnes (54,800,000 long tons; 61,400,000 short tons) at 16% zinc. This is adjacent to the Main pit. It is well understood geologically and metallurgically. A Supplemental Environmental Impact Statement is expected to be produced in 2008 as part of the process of permitting the development of this ore body. Most of the waste rock from this operation is expected to be placed in the depleted Main pit. The Qanaiyaq ore body with 4.7 million tonnes (4,600,000 long tons; 5,200,000 short tons) at 23.7% zinc. Also an open-pit target, studies of the ore characteristics of Qanaiyaq continue. The Paalaaq ore body with 13 million tonnes (13,000,000 long tons; 14,000,000 short tons) at 15% zinc and the Anarraaq ore body with 17.2 million tonnes (16,900,000 long tons; 19,000,000 short tons) at 15% zinc are both deep underground and will be accessed by tunnels and shafts, if they are eventually mined.

== Geography ==
Red Dog mine is located at 68°4′19″N 162°52′34″W. It is in the De Long Mountains in the remote western Brooks Range about 90 miles (140 km) north of Kotzebue and 56 miles (90 km) from the Chukchi Sea.

=== Regional ===
The mine lies within the Northwest Arctic Borough, the boundaries of which are exactly coincident with the boundaries of the NANA Regional Corporation. The borough, which is approximately the size of Indiana, has only 11 communities and a population of only 7,208 people, 84% of whom are native or part native, and 40% of whom report speaking native at home. No roads connect the communities. The nearest permanent settlements to the mine, roughly 60 miles (100 km) west and 50 miles (80 km) south respectively, are the villages of Kivalina, population 377, and Noatak, population 428, at the 2000 census.

Although native populations have historically used areas around the mine and port for seasonal food-gathering, there are no permanent residents at the mine or port site. The workforce consists of about 460 employees and contractors, of whom somewhat more than half will be on-site at any given time. All staff work on a rotation, most on either a 4 weeks on/2 weeks off or 2 week on/1 week off schedule. At the mine, everybody stays in the single large housing unit, tucked in among the process buildings near the edge of the open pit. A small portion of the work force stays at the port site. Contracted employees stay at the ConPac south of the main accommodations during the summer months. NANA shareholders comprise 56% of the mine's workforce.

The Red Dog mine provides over a quarter of the borough's wage and salary payroll. While many of the borough's residents benefit from the mine and associated economic activities, virtually all of the borough's residents rely on subsistence activities which are dependent on a healthy environment.

== Environmental concerns ==
=== Environmental Protection Agency's Toxic Releases Inventory (TRI) ===
According to the U.S. Environmental Protection Agency (EPA) 2016 Toxic Releases Inventory (TRI), Red Dog Mine was the source of more toxic releases than any other facility in the United States. Although, no "toxic releases" come "from within the bounds of this small tundra metropolis, Kotzebue, the methods used by the EPA's TRI reported that in 2016, Kotzebue, with only 7,500 inhabitants, "produced" 756 million pounds of toxins. Forbes also published the claim and added that the second most toxic was Bingham Canyon, Utah, at 200 million pounds of toxins. At the county level the Northwest Arctic of Alaska leads the list with 756,000,000 pounds of toxins. The state of Alaska produces three times more toxins than every other American state—834 million pounds. The TRI placed Kotzebue as the most toxic place in the United States. However, as National Geographic explains, the source of the toxins is not Kotzebue, but Red Dog Mine. Since the mine is located in a remote area in Alaska, the toxic release is linked to the nearest "city"— Kotzebue. The EPA says that when a "facility" is "not located in a city, town, village, or similar entity will often list a nearby city." National Geographic says that, "All 756 million pounds of toxic chemicals attributed to "Kotzebue" on the TRI dataset came from one of the world's largest zinc and lead mines, the Red Dog Mine, which is located about 80 miles north of Kotzebue." There is no evidence that Kotzebue is at any risk of toxic pollution.

Red Dog's 2016 releases included "83,578 pounds of cadmium compounds, 1,435,542 pounds of chromium compounds, 415,802 pounds of mercury compounds, and 319,192,113 pounds of lead compounds, all of which was reportedly disposed of on-site at the mine."

ACAT's executive director, Pamela Miller, says that the industry's claim that "elements like lead and cadmium" are "naturally occurring" in the region, may be true, but both lead and cadmium "are nonetheless toxic". "Lead is one of the most well-known toxic substances, with neurotoxic properties that are very well established, and it is especially toxic to children." "The mining industry will make the argument this is just waste rock, but the fact is you are bringing this large amount of heavy metal-concentrated ore to the Earth's surface and exposing that to the elements, and this promotes the oxidization and leaching of these metals, which is why the EPA requires them to report this way under the TRI," according to Miller.

=== The Red Dog Mine Haul Road ===
According to 2001 reports, the ore from the mine is transported by ore trucks that weigh 100 tons (net 72-ton payload) that carry 1.1 million dry tons of lead-zinc concentrate annually on the 52-mile (84 km) Red Dog Mine Haul Road to the state-owned, Teck-operated DeLong Mountain Port Facility on the Chuckchi Sea. By 2001, the trucks were dispatched approximately every 15 minutes, twenty-four hours a day all year long.

Teck Resources said that while it is generally agreed that years of operation of tarp-top haul trucks carrying lead-zinc concentrate resulted in lead and cadmium-bearing dust contamination along the edges of the haul road, that this practice did not result in a threat to human safety. In 2008, Teck Resources said that the entire concentrate-haulage system had been improved, including tight-fitting seals on side-dump trucks and enclosure of conveyor belts at the port site.

A 24-mile (39 km) section of this road traverses National Park Service (NPS) lands in Cape Krusenstern National Monument (CAKR). A 2001 NPS study investigated the potential of heavy metals from the dust of the stream of trucks on low-lying vegetation in the park. A 2001 NPR reports found that, the "environmental levels of [cadmium] (Cd) in the Red Dog data set far exceed the maxima reported for severely polluted locations in Central European countries such as the Czech Republic, Poland, Romania, and Bulgaria. Almost all moss concentrations from this Red Dog study are greater than the cadmium endpoint considered highly polluted in the Nordic moss monitoring program (0.8 mg/kg dw)."

A July 19, 2004 report by the Alaska Community Action on Toxics (ACAT)— an Anchorage-based "environmental health research and advocacy organization group", criticized the 2001 "Alaska Division of Public Health (ADPH) investigation, conclusions, and recommendations" and called for "more environmental and human testing, restricting areas for subsistence food gathering, and increasing efforts to control pollution sources and environmental contamination." This 2004 report presents no new data and was "based upon a re-analysis and re-interpretation of data that were reported in 2001 and 2002."

Some research has shown that the road has a significant impact on the fall migrations of the Western Arctic Caribou Herd, with some caribou being delayed by up to two months before successfully crossing the road.

=== Leaching of metals and acids from waste rocks ===
According to a 2005 Alaska Business Monthly, leaching of metals and acids from waste rocks into the environment is a valid concern. The waste rock piles are contained and all runoff water is monitored and treated to water quality standards. Monitoring, and mitigation if necessary, will need to continue throughout the mine life and for many decades after mine closure. All of the waste rock and tailings material remains in permanent disposal on-site, contained, and treated as necessary by the mine operations. The EPA notes about Red Dog's rank, "No conclusions on the potential risks can be made based solely on this information."

=== Alaska Pollutant Discharge Elimination System ===
In Alaska it is legal for mines to discharge treated wastewater into rivers and streams under the Alaska Pollutant Discharge Elimination System permit. Red Dog mine legally discharges treated wastewater into the Middle Fork of Red Dog Creek. This is of concern to community members of the village of Kivalina, Alaska, near the mouth of the Wulik River, a "source of fish and water for villagers". In 2016, Kivalina sued Teck Resources for polluting its water source.

The Red Dog mine discharged treated water into Red Dog Creek, a tributary of Ikalukrok Creek. On June 13, 2007 the State of Alaska removed two creeks (Red Dog Creek and Ikalukrok Creek) near the Red Dog mine in Northwest Alaska from the most-polluted waters list with EPA's approval. The mine discharges treated water into Red Dog Creek, a tributary of Ikalukrok Creek. Pre-mining studies on Red Dog Creek revealed naturally high concentrations of cadmium, lead, zinc, aluminum, and other metals. Before mining began, aquatic life uses were not present in the main stem of Red Dog Creek because of the natural toxic concentrations and low pH. After mining began, year-round release of treated mine wastewater allowed a population of Arctic Grayling to establish themselves in Red Dog Creek. The EPA reported in August 2007, that the fish population was protected by regulations.

In 2026, Alaska extended Red Dog Mine's wastewater permit compliance schedule for an additional ten years, through May 2036. The extension allows the mine to continue seasonal discharges of treated wastewater under interim limits while Teck develops and implements a long-term solution for managing water with elevated total dissolved solids.

=== Delong Mountain Transportation System ===
The Delong Mountain Transportation System includes the 52-mile (84 km) Red Dog Mine Haul Road that connects the mine to the state-owned but Teck Resources-operated DeLong Mountain Port facilities on the Chukchi Sea. The road was "constructed to deliver zinc mined at Red Dog to world markets". A 2018 North of 60 Mining article described it as Alaska Industrial Development and Export Authority (AIDEA)-funded "most successful" projects to date—a "model for future partnerships." AIDEA was established by the Alaska Legislature in 1967 as a public corporation and is not state-funded. Local inhabitants have expressed concerns that the proposed expansion of DeLong Mountain Port docking facilities may detrimentally change the migratory patterns of marine life.

The mine's airport, known as Red Dog Airport, provides the main access. Mine workers from remote villages in the region are ferried to the mine on small aircraft. Alaska Airlines is contracted by the mine to fly other mine workers out of Anchorage. Until 2007, gravel-strip capable Boeing 737-200 Combi aircraft were used. These ships have a cargo door in the front part of the aircraft and a separate rear passenger cabin. In 2005 the runway was paved, in anticipation of newer Boeing 737-400 Combi aircraft which are not equipped to land on gravel.

In 2014, the United States Environmental Protection Agency reported on a use attainability analysis (UAA). In 2014, state regulators approved a plan which allowed the mine to continue using Red Dog Creek as a mixing zone, although there has been a long-discussed plan to build a 52-mile (84 km) pipeline to the Chukchi Sea to avoid dumping wastewater into the creek.

=== 2024 Environmental Protection Agency settlement ===
In August 2024, the operators of Red Dog Mine agreed to pay over $429,794 to the U.S. Environmental Protection Agency (EPA) as part of a settlement regarding hazardous waste violations that occurred from October 2019 until January 2024. This was the largest violation in the mine's history.

The violations included failures to properly identify, store, report, and treat hazardous waste at Red Dog's laboratory. Teck Alaska contended that the violations stemmed from a “different interpretation of EPA requirements for identifying, storing and disposing” hazardous waste and involved less than 200 grams of solid residual material. Kevin Schanilec—a hazardous waste compliance officer for the EPA—stated that a much greater amount of waste was involved and that had it been properly reported, the mine "would have been a category in a higher category of waste generation that exceeds 1,000 kilograms (2204 lbs) per month.”

Teck was given until June of 2025 to ensure that the tank and piping in the mine's laboratory were clean and not a potential source of environmental contamination.

=== 2025 Process Water Spill ===
On May 14, 2025, a slurry pump failure caused an overflow of process water at the mine. The Alaska Department of Environmental Conservation initially estimated that up to 400,000 gallons were released, most of which remained within containment, while approximately 100 to 1,000 gallons reached the tundra and Red Dog Creek. In September 2026, the United States Environmental Protection Agency proposed a $21,618 civil penalty against Teck Alaska for discharging approximately 1,000 gallons of process water into the Middle Fork of Red Dog Creek in violation of the mine's discharge permit and the Clean Water Act. Under the proposed settlement, Teck Alaska neither admitted nor denied the allegations and certified that it had corrected the violation.

== Climate ==
Red Dog Mine has a subarctic climate (Dfc) with mild summers and severely cold winters.

Climate data for Red Dog Mine, Alaska
Month	Jan	Feb	Mar	Apr	May	Jun	Jul	Aug	Sep	Oct	Nov	Dec	Year
Record high °F (°C)	47 (8)	38 (3)	37 (3)	52 (11)	80 (27)	87 (31)	85 (29)	76 (24)	65 (18)	60 (16)	41 (5)	37 (3)	87 (31)
Mean daily maximum °F (°C)	12.7 (−10.7)	14.9 (−9.5)	13.3 (−10.4)	26.7 (−2.9)	44.2 (6.8)	60.9 (16.1)	61.3 (16.3)	55.2 (12.9)	45.7 (7.6)	31.4 (−0.3)	18.0 (−7.8)	11.4 (−11.4)	33.0 (0.6)
Daily mean °F (°C)	6.6 (−14.1)	8.1 (−13.3)	6.6 (−14.1)	20.0 (−6.7)	36.6 (2.6)	50.9 (10.5)	53.1 (11.7)	48.2 (9.0)	39.1 (3.9)	26.5 (−3.1)	12.6 (−10.8)	5.4 (−14.8)	26.1 (−3.3)
Mean daily minimum °F (°C)	0.4 (−17.6)	1.3 (−17.1)	−0.1 (−17.8)	13.3 (−10.4)	29.0 (−1.7)	40.9 (4.9)	44.9 (7.2)	41.2 (5.1)	32.6 (0.3)	21.6 (−5.8)	7.3 (−13.7)	−0.6 (−18.1)	19.3 (−7.1)
Record low °F (°C)	−41 (−41)	−43 (−42)	−24 (−31)	−11 (−24)	−1 (−18)	23 (−5)	28 (−2)	21 (−6)	13 (−11)	1 (−17)	−19 (−28)	−28 (−33)	−43 (−42)
Average precipitation inches (mm)	1.99 (51)	1.08 (27)	0.97 (25)	0.31 (7.9)	1.58 (40)	1.45 (37)	3.80 (97)	5.18 (132)	2.46 (62)	1.58 (40)	0.92 (23)	1.06 (27)	22.38 (568.9)
Average snowfall inches (cm)	17.4 (44)	—	—	—	—	—	—	trace	—	—	—	—	—

== See also ==
- Sedimentary exhalative deposits
- Acid mine drainage
- Land rehabilitation
- Open-pit mining
- Metallurgy
- Zinc mining in the United States
