= Bush Caucus =

- Ideology: Bipartisanship
- Seats in the State Senate: 2 / 20
- Seats in the State House: 4 / 40

The Bush Caucus consists of bipartisan members of the Alaska Legislature who represent rural interests. The caucus typically consists of the members of the Alaska House from Districts 37-40 and the Alaska Senate from districts S and T, which cover the Alaskan Bush.

The group is bipartisan with most members being Democrats or Independents. Former congresswoman Mary Peltola is a past chair of this caucus.

== State Senate ==
- Lyman Hoffman (1991-1993, 1995–present)
- Donny Olson (2001–present)

== State House ==
- Mary Peltola (1999-2009)
- Bryce Edgmon (2007–present)
- Neal Foster (2009–present)
- Tiffany Zulkosky (2018-2023)
- Josiah Patkotak (2021–2023)
- Conrad McCormick (2023–present)
- Thomas Baker (2023–2025)
