= Alaska Industrial Development and Export Authority =

State-owned corporation in Alaska, U.S.

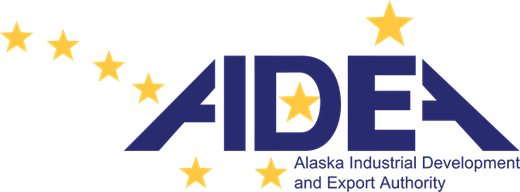
- Formerly: Alaska Industrial Development Authority
- Type: State-owned
- Founded: 1967
- Headquarters: Anchorage, Alaska, U.S.
- Area served: Alaska
- Website: www.aidea.org

The Alaska Industrial Development and Export Authority (AIDEA) is a government-owned corporation in the U.S. state of Alaska. Its goal is to promote economic development in the state by providing financing to Alaskan businesses and industrial projects.

== History ==
The organization was established by the Alaska State Legislature in 1967 as the Alaska Industrial Development Authority (AIDA). Its powers were expanded by the state legislature in 1987, and its name was changed to the Alaska Industrial Development and Export Authority (AIDEA).

The AIDEA has funded projects such as the Ambler Road and oil exploration in the Arctic National Wildlife Refuge.

In October 2024, AIDEA approved up to $20 million to prepare bids for a new federal oil lease sale in the Arctic National Wildlife Refuge, required under a 2017 law. AIDEA previously secured leases in a 2021 sale that was later canceled by the Biden administration, a decision it is challenging in court. Officials said the move positions AIDEA to pursue potential oil development with economic benefits for Alaska, though the plan has drawn opposition from environmental and Indigenous groups.

== See also ==
- Alaska Department of Commerce, Community, and Economic Development
