= Kotzebue, Alaska =

City in Alaska, United States

Kotzebue Qikiqtaġruk
- City
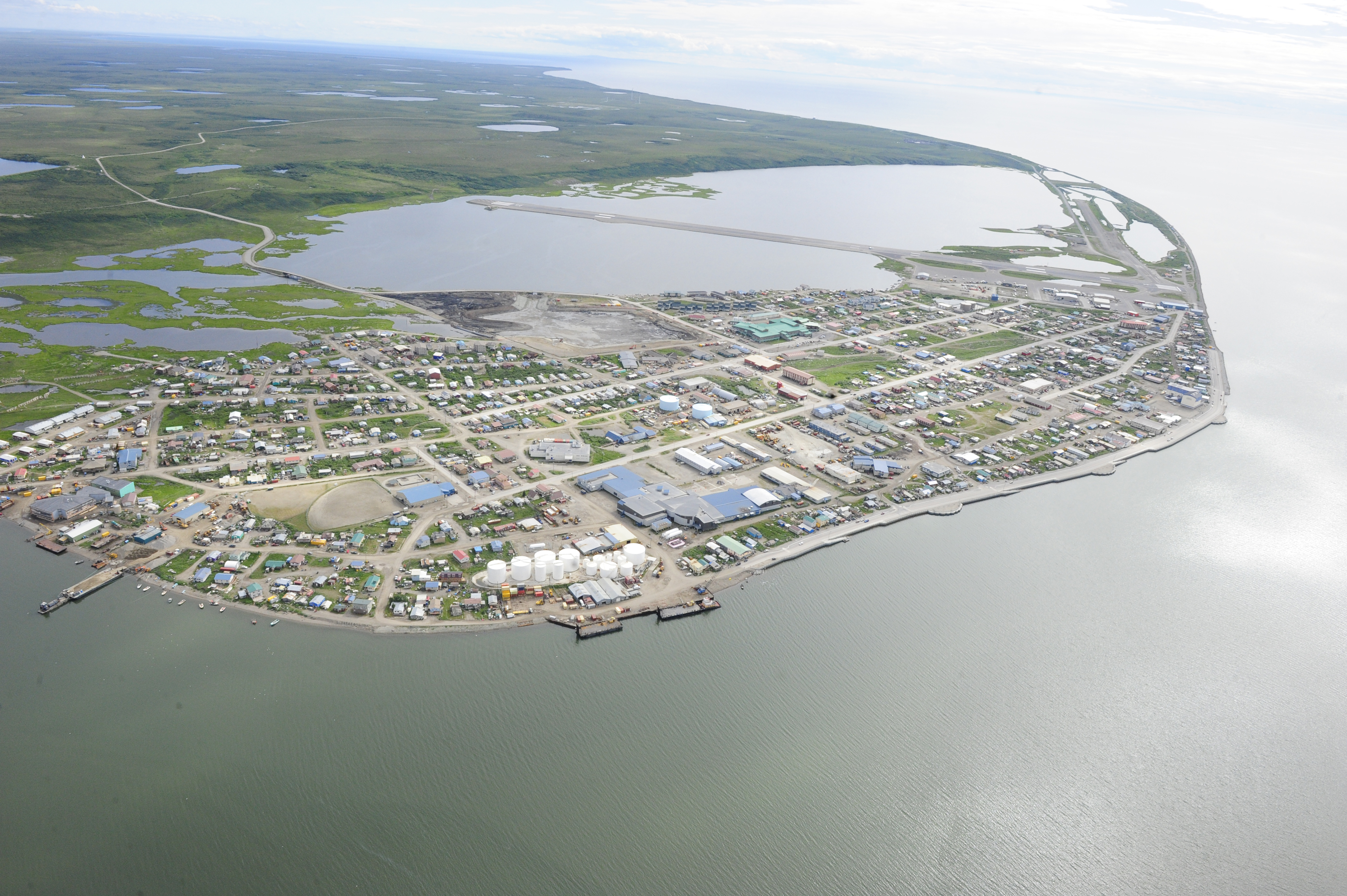
- Aerial view of Kotzebue

- Seal
- Motto: "Gateway to the Arctic" "An All American City"
- Location in Northwest Arctic Borough and the state of Alaska.
- Interactive map of Kotzebue
- Location within Alaska
- Coordinates: 66°53′50″N 162°35′8″W
- Country: United States
- State: Alaska
- Borough: Northwest Arctic
- Incorporated: October 14, 1958

Government
  - Type: Council-manager
  - Mayor: Saima Chase
  - State senator: Donny Olson (D)
  - State rep.: Robyn Burke (D)

Area
  - Total: 26.50 sq mi (68.64 km^{2})
  - Land: 24.76 sq mi (64.12 km^{2})
  - Water: 1.75 sq mi (4.52 km^{2})
- Elevation: 20 ft (6 m)

Population (2020)
  - Total: 3,102
  - Density: 125.3/sq mi (48.38/km^{2})
- Time zone: UTC−9 (AKST)
  - Summer (DST): UTC−8 (AKDT)
- ZIP code: 99752
- Area code: 907
- FIPS code: 02-41830
- GNIS feature ID: 1413378
- Website: City of Kotzebue, Alaska

Kotzebue (/ˈkɒtsəbjuː/ KOTS-ə-bew) or Qikiqtaġruk (/kɪkɪkˈtʌɡrʊk/ kik-ik-TUG-rook, Inupiaq: [qekeqtɑʁʐuk]) is a city in the Northwest Arctic Borough in the U.S. state of Alaska. It is the borough's seat, by far its largest community and the economic and transportation hub of the subregion of Alaska encompassing the borough. The population of the city was 3,102 as of the 2020 census, down from 3,201 in 2010.

== History ==
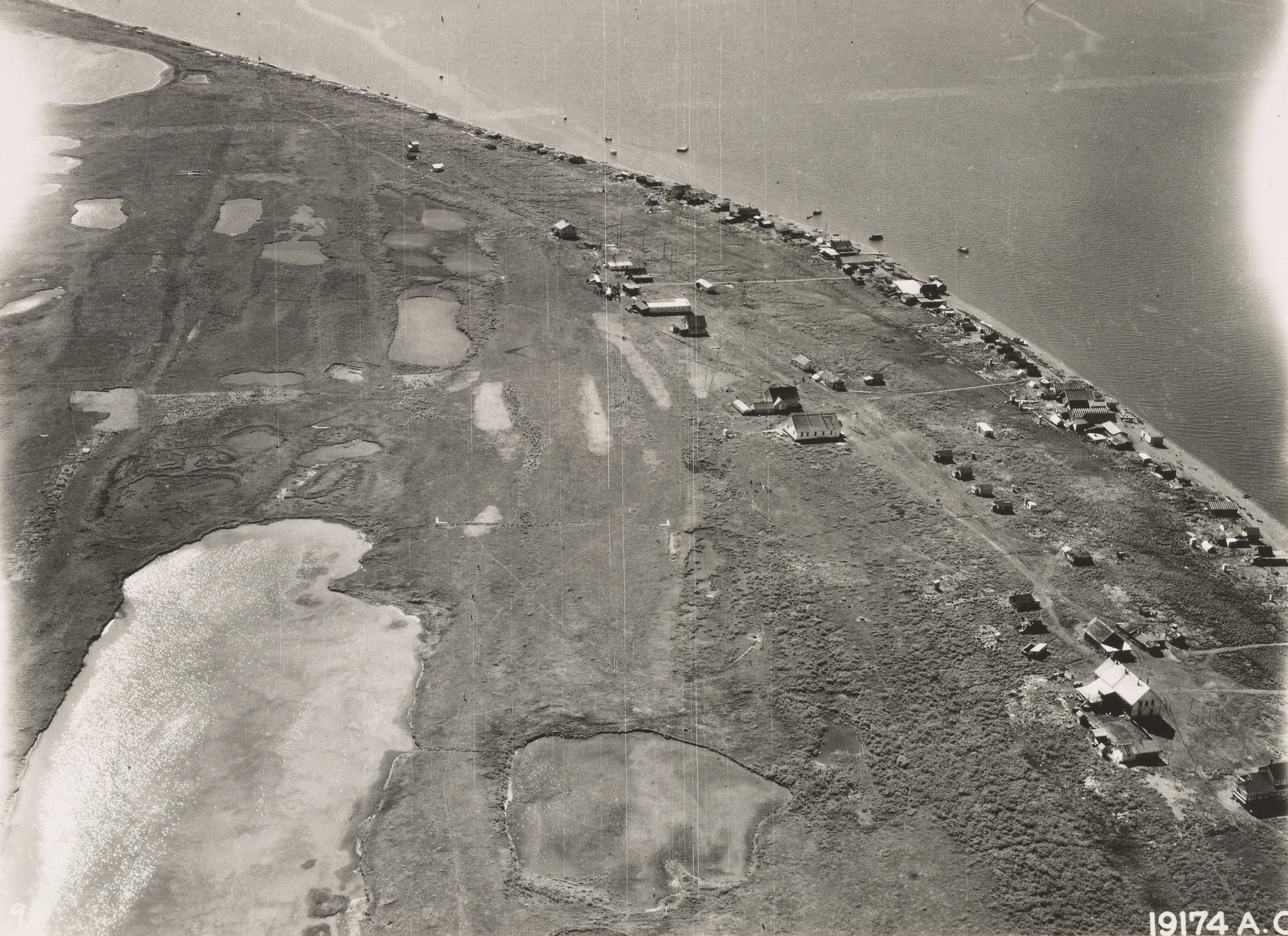
Kotzebue in 1935

=== Etymology and prehistory ===
Owing to its location and relative size, Kotzebue served as a trading and gathering center for the various communities in the region. The Noatak, Selawik and Kobuk Rivers drain into the Kotzebue Sound near Kotzebue to form a center for transportation to points inland. In addition to people from interior villages, inhabitants of far-eastern Asia, now the Russian Far East, came to trade at Kotzebue. Furs, seal oil, hides, rifles, ammunition, and seal skins were some of the items traded. People also gathered for competitions like the current World Eskimo Indian Olympics. With the arrival of the whalers, traders, gold seekers, and missionaries, the trading center expanded.

Kotzebue is also known as Qikiqtaġruk, which means "small island" or "resembles an island" in the Iñupiaq language. In the words of the late Iñupiaq elder Blanche Qapuk Lincoln of Kotzebue:

Iḷiḷgaaŋukapta tamarra pamna imiqaqtuq. Taavaasii kuuqahuni taiñña Adams-kutlu Ipaaluk-kutlu, taapkuak piagun tavra. Taiñña suli Katyauratkutlu, Lena Norton tupqata piagun tavra kuuk suli taugani...Manna uvva qikiqtaq, Qikiqtaġruŋmik tavra atiqautiginiġaa qikiqtaupluni. Nunałhaiñġuqtuq marra pakma. ("When we were children there was water behind front street and a slough between the Ipalooks and Adams'. There was another slough over between Coppocks and Lena Norton's house...The island on Front Street led to Kotzebue being called Qikiqtaġruk because island in Iñupiaq is called qikiqtaq.").

Kotzebue gets its name from the Kotzebue Sound, which was named after Otto von Kotzebue, a Baltic German who explored the sound while searching for the Northwest Passage in the service of Russia in 1818.

=== 19th century ===
A United States post office was established in 1899.

=== 20th century ===
In 1958, Kotzebue Air Force Station was completed. The radar site would be operated by on-site personnel until its deactivation in 1983 and the subsequent demolition of most of the station's structures. The radome continues to operate, but is now mostly unattended.

In 1990, the German drama film Salmonberries starring k.d. lang was mostly shot in Kotzebue.

In 1997, three 66-kW wind turbines were installed in Kotzebue, creating the northernmost wind farm in the United States. As of 2018, the wind farm consisted of 19 turbines, including two 900 kW EWT turbines. The total installed capacity has reached 3 MW, displacing approximately 250,000 gallons of diesel fuel every year.

=== 21st century ===
On September 2, 2015, U.S. President Barack Obama gave a speech on global warming in Kotzebue, becoming the first sitting president to visit a site north of the Arctic Circle.

Since 2016, the United States Coast Guard has deployed MH-60 Jayhawk helicopters to Kotzebue from the beginning of July to the end of October as part of Operation Arctic Shield.

In 2017, the city received an All-America City award from the National Civic League.

On December 3, 2018, Mike Dunleavy was sworn in as the 12th governor of Alaska in Kotzebue's high school gymnasium after inclement weather thwarted his plan to hold the ceremony in Noorvik.

In November 2023, ProPublica and Anchorage Daily News released an investigative report of domestic abuse and potential murders in Kotzebue involving six indigenous women who had dated Mayor Clement Richards Sr's three sons, resulting in a total of 16 charges that were ultimately dismissed by local prosecutors or received minimum sentences by local judicial magistrates. While a state medical examiner stated for one of the women that there were "signs of strangulation", the local police eventually closed the case as suicide. In January 2024, the police released a statement saying they would not be reopening the case, with their timeline of events in the statement contradicting events that occurred just after the woman's death. The city police said the other case of strangulation on the Mayor's property was referred to state investigators, though the Alaska Department of Public Safety said no such case was ever given to them.

== Geography ==
Kotzebue lies on a gravel spit at the end of the Baldwin Peninsula in the Kotzebue Sound. It is located at 66°53′50″N 162°35′8″W (66.897192, −162.585444), approximately 30 miles (48 km) from Noatak, Kiana, and other nearby smaller communities. It is 33 miles (53 km) north of the Arctic Circle on Alaska's western coast.

According to the United States Census Bureau, the city has a total area of 28.7 square miles (74 km^{2}), of which 27.0 square miles (70 km^{2}) is land, and 1.6 square miles (4.1 km^{2}), or 5.76%, is water.

Kotzebue is home to the NANA Regional Corporation, one of thirteen Alaska Native Regional Corporations created under the Alaska Native Claims Settlement Act of 1971 (ANCSA) in settlement of Alaska Native land claims.

Kotzebue is a gateway to Kobuk Valley National Park and other natural attractions of northern Alaska. The Northwest Arctic Heritage Center, operated by the National Park Service, serves as a community meeting space and visitor center to Kobuk Valley National Park, Noatak National Preserve and Cape Krusenstern National Monument. Nearby Selawik National Wildlife Refuge also maintains office space in the town.

=== Climate ===
Kotzebue has a dry subarctic climate (Köppen Dfc), with long, somewhat snowy, and very cold winters, and short, mild summers; diurnal temperature variation is low to minimal throughout the year, with an annual normal of 11.6 °F (6.4 °C) and a minimum normal of 8.0 °F (4.4 °C) in October. Monthly daily average temperatures range from −1.9 °F (−18.8 °C) in January to 55.3 °F (12.9 °C) in July, with an annual mean of 24.0 °F (−4.4 °C). Days with the maximum reaching at or above 70 °F (21 °C) can be expected an average of six days per summer. Precipitation is both most frequent and greatest during the summer months with August the wettest month averaging 2.13 in (54 mm). Kotzebue average precipitation is 11.36 in (289 mm) per year. Snowfall averages about 64.2 in (163 cm) a season (July through June of the next year). Extreme temperatures have ranged from −58 °F (−50 °C) on March 16, 1930, to 85 °F (29 °C) as recently as June 19, 2013. The coldest month on record was January 1934 with a mean temperature of −27.3 °F (−32.9 °C), while the warmest month was July 2009 at 60.0 °F (15.6 °C); (Note: The July 2019 average measured an average temperature of 63.7 °F (17.6 °C), but NOAA later rescinded its recognition of the temperature record and deleted the May–August 2019 temperature data from its database.) the annual mean temperature has ranged from 16.5 °F (−8.6 °C) in 1964 to 29.7 °F (−1.3 °C) in 2016.

Climate data for Kotzebue Airport, Alaska (1991–2020 normals, (Note: Mean monthly maxima and minima (i.e. the highest and lowest temperature readings during an entire month or year) calculated based on data at said location from 1991 to 2020.) extremes 1897–present)
Month	Jan	Feb	Mar	Apr	May	Jun	Jul	Aug	Sep	Oct	Nov	Dec	Year
Record high °F (°C)	40 (4)	40 (4)	42 (6)	49 (9)	74 (23)	85 (29)	85 (29)	80 (27)	69 (21)	57 (14)	40 (4)	39 (4)	85 (29)
Mean maximum °F (°C)	30.8 (−0.7)	31.2 (−0.4)	30.0 (−1.1)	39.0 (3.9)	56.1 (13.4)	71.4 (21.9)	73.5 (23.1)	68.4 (20.2)	59.6 (15.3)	43.8 (6.6)	32.4 (0.2)	29.2 (−1.6)	76.0 (24.4)
Mean daily maximum °F (°C)	4.5 (−15.3)	8.6 (−13.0)	9.1 (−12.7)	23.8 (−4.6)	39.0 (3.9)	53.2 (11.8)	60.1 (15.6)	56.6 (13.7)	47.5 (8.6)	30.8 (−0.7)	15.9 (−8.9)	8.6 (−13.0)	29.8 (−1.2)
Daily mean °F (°C)	−1.9 (−18.8)	1.4 (−17.0)	1.5 (−16.9)	16.3 (−8.7)	33.1 (0.6)	47.5 (8.6)	55.3 (12.9)	52.1 (11.2)	43.1 (6.2)	26.9 (−2.8)	10.8 (−11.8)	2.4 (−16.4)	24.0 (−4.4)
Mean daily minimum °F (°C)	−8.4 (−22.4)	−5.8 (−21.0)	−6.0 (−21.1)	8.8 (−12.9)	27.3 (−2.6)	41.8 (5.4)	50.5 (10.3)	47.7 (8.7)	38.7 (3.7)	23.0 (−5.0)	5.6 (−14.7)	−3.8 (−19.9)	18.3 (−7.6)
Mean minimum °F (°C)	−34.0 (−36.7)	−31.0 (−35.0)	−26.7 (−32.6)	−13.6 (−25.3)	10.8 (−11.8)	30.5 (−0.8)	41.6 (5.3)	38.5 (3.6)	27.8 (−2.3)	6.4 (−14.2)	−14.4 (−25.8)	−26.0 (−32.2)	−37.4 (−38.6)
Record low °F (°C)	−55 (−48)	−52 (−47)	−58 (−50)	−44 (−42)	−18 (−28)	20 (−7)	30 (−1)	26 (−3)	13 (−11)	−19 (−28)	−37 (−38)	−49 (−45)	−58 (−50)
Average precipitation inches (mm)	0.62 (16)	0.85 (22)	0.52 (13)	0.56 (14)	0.44 (11)	0.60 (15)	1.60 (41)	2.13 (54)	1.42 (36)	1.07 (27)	0.82 (21)	0.73 (19)	11.36 (289)
Average snowfall inches (cm)	9.4 (24)	13.1 (33)	6.4 (16)	4.7 (12)	1.2 (3.0)	0.0 (0.0)	0.0 (0.0)	0.0 (0.0)	0.6 (1.5)	5.9 (15)	11.0 (28)	11.9 (30)	64.2 (163)
Average extreme snow depth inches (cm)	25.6 (65)	31.4 (80)	32.2 (82)	30.4 (77)	15.2 (39)	0.2 (0.51)	0.0 (0.0)	0.0 (0.0)	0.2 (0.51)	3.8 (9.7)	10.9 (28)	18.9 (48)	38.3 (97)
Average precipitation days (≥ 0.01 in)	8.6	9.8	7.3	6.7	7.0	6.1	11.1	13.5	11.8	11.5	9.6	10.3	113.3
Average snowy days (≥ 0.1 in)	9.5	10.4	7.8	6.2	2.2	0.1	0.0	0.0	0.9	7.1	9.9	11.4	65.5
Average relative humidity (%)	72.0	70.2	71.1	76.3	81.2	81.8	80.7	81.2	79.2	79.1	76.5	73.7	76.9
Average dew point °F (°C)	−7.1 (−21.7)	−11.9 (−24.4)	−6.5 (−21.4)	5.7 (−14.6)	25.9 (−3.4)	37.8 (3.2)	47.7 (8.7)	46.2 (7.9)	35.6 (2.0)	17.4 (−8.1)	2.1 (−16.6)	−7.2 (−21.8)	15.5 (−9.2)
Source 1: NOAA (relative humidity 1961–1990)
Source 2: Weather Atlas

Coastal temperature data for Kotzebue
Month	Jan	Feb	Mar	Apr	May	Jun	Jul	Aug	Sep	Oct	Nov	Dec	Year
Average sea temperature °F (°C)	29.7 (-1.28)	30.0 (-1.11)	29.3 (-1.50)	29.1 (-1.61)	29.8 (-1.22)	32.9 (0.50)	47.3 (8.50)	52.7 (11.50)	48.0 (8.89)	39.9 (4.39)	29.8 (-1.22)	28.6 (-1.89)	35.6 (2.00)
Source 1: Seatemperature.net

See or edit raw graph data.

== Demographics ==
Historical population
Census	Pop.	Note	%±
1880	200		—
1910	193		—
1920	230		19.2%
1930	291		26.5%
1940	372		27.8%
1950	623		67.5%
1960	1,290		107.1%
1970	1,696		31.5%
1980	2,054		21.1%
1990	2,751		33.9%
2000	3,082		12.0%
2010	3,201		3.9%
2020	3,102		−3.1%
U.S. Decennial Census

Kotzebue first appeared on the 1880 U.S. Census under its predecessor unincorporated Inuit village named "Kikiktagamute." It did not appear again until 1910, then as Kotzebue. It was formally incorporated in 1958.

=== 2020 census ===
As of the 2020 census, Kotzebue had a population of 3,102. The median age was 31.0 years. 31.5% of residents were under the age of 18 and 7.3% of residents were 65 years of age or older. For every 100 females there were 105.3 males, and for every 100 females age 18 and over there were 105.1 males age 18 and over.

0.0% of residents lived in urban areas, while 100.0% lived in rural areas.

There were 895 households in Kotzebue, of which 45.9% had children under the age of 18 living in them. Of all households, 36.0% were married-couple households, 24.1% were households with a male householder and no spouse or partner present, and 26.9% were households with a female householder and no spouse or partner present. About 23.4% of all households were made up of individuals and 6.1% had someone living alone who was 65 years of age or older.

There were 1,021 housing units, of which 12.3% were vacant. The homeowner vacancy rate was 0.0% and the rental vacancy rate was 8.6%.

Racial composition as of the 2020 census
Race	Number	Percent
White	505	16.3%
Black or African American	64	2.1%
American Indian and Alaska Native	2,117	68.2%
Asian	48	1.5%
Native Hawaiian and Other Pacific Islander	11	0.4%
Some other race	20	0.6%
Two or more races	337	10.9%
Hispanic or Latino (of any race)	77	2.5%

=== 2000 census ===
As of the 2000 census, there were 3,082 people, 889 households, and 656 families residing in the city. The population density was 114.1 inhabitants per square mile (44.1/km^{2}). There were 1,007 housing units at an average density of 37.3 per square mile (14.4/km^{2}). The racial makeup of the city was 71.2% American Indian, 19.5% White, 1.8% Asian, 0.3% Black or African American, 0.1% Pacific Islander, 0.8% from other races, and 6.4% from two or more races. Hispanic or Latino of any race were 1.2% of the population.

There were 889 households, out of which 50.4% had children under the age of 18 living with them, 46.1% were married couples living together, 17.4% had a female householder with no husband present, and 26.1% were non-families. 19.3% of all households were made up of individuals, and 2.0% had someone living alone who was 65 years of age or older. The average household size was 3.40 and the average family size was 3.93.

In the city, the age distribution of the population shows 39.8% under the age of 18, 8.5% from 18 to 24, 30.4% from 25 to 44, 17.2% from 45 to 64, and 4.1% who were 65 years of age or older. The median age was 26 years. For every 100 females, there were 102.0 males. For every 100 females age 18 and over, there were 104.5 males.

The median income for a household in the city was $57,163, and the median income for a family was $58,068. Males had a median income of $42,604 versus $36,453 for females. The per capita income for the city was $18,289. About 9.2% of families and 13.1% of the population were below the poverty line, including 14.9% of those under age 18 and 6.0% of those age 65 or over.

== Infrastructure ==
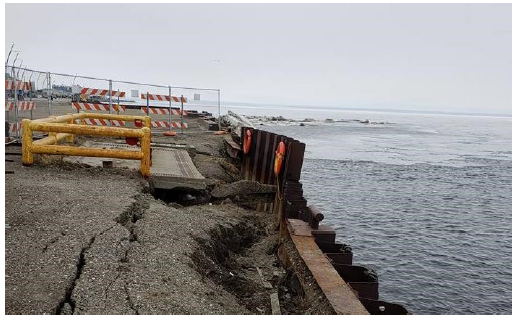
Kotzebue dock under repair

=== Transportation ===
Kotzebue's Ralph Wien Memorial Airport is the one airport in the Northwest Arctic Borough with regularly scheduled large commercial passenger aircraft service to and from Ted Stevens Anchorage International Airport and the Nome Airport.

=== Health care ===
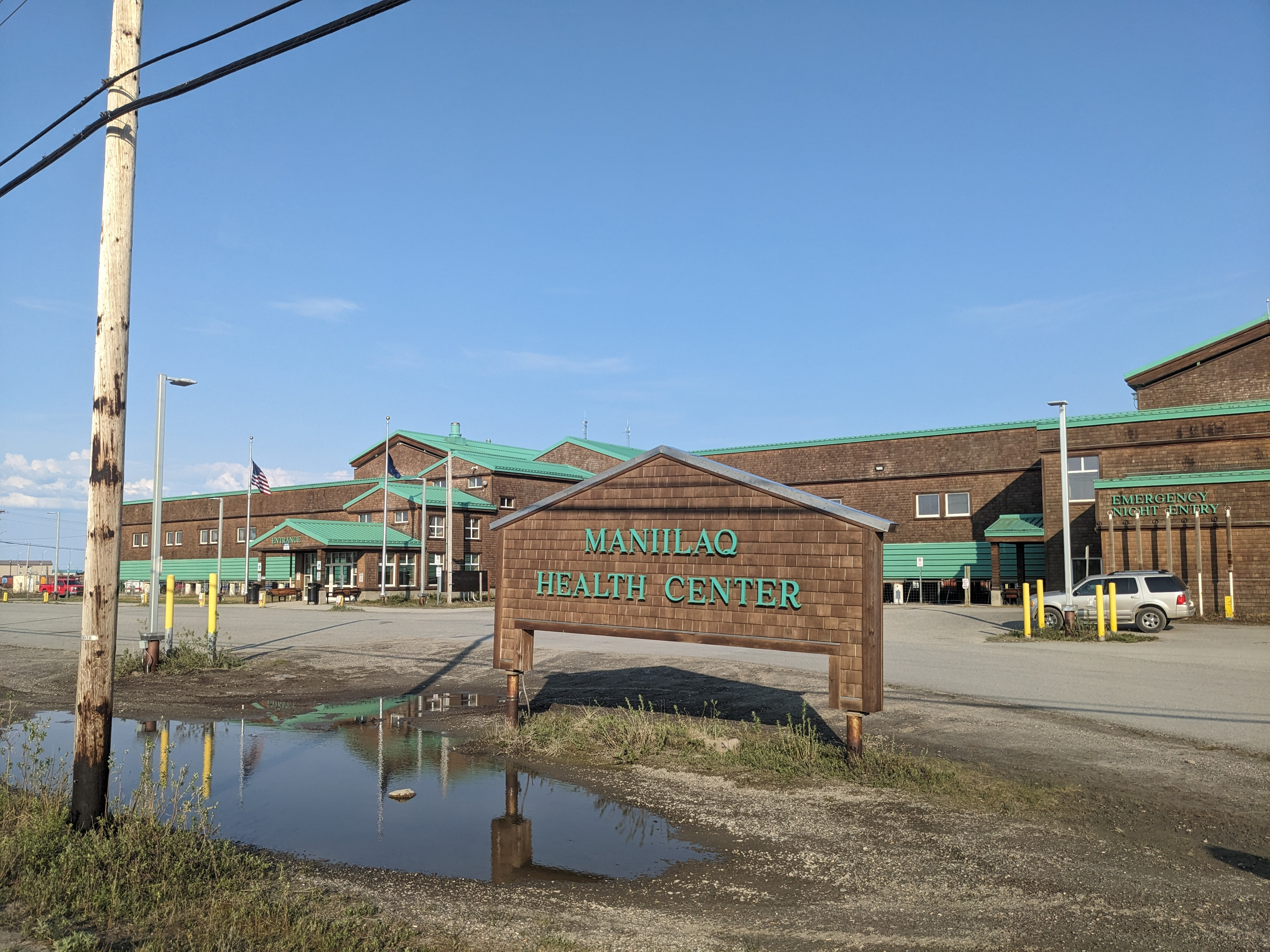
Maniilaq Health Center

Kotzebue is home to the Maniilaq Association, a tribally-operated health and social services organization named after Maniilaq and part of the Alaska Native Tribal Health Consortium. Maniilaq Health Center is the primary health care facility for the residents of the Northwest Arctic Borough. The facility houses an emergency room with local and medevac support for accident/trauma victims, as well as an ambulatory care clinic, dental and eye care clinics, a pharmacy, a specialty clinic, and an inpatient wing with 17 beds for recovering patients.

Health care providers at Maniilaq Health Center provide telemedicine support to Community Health Aides (CHAPs) in the outlying villages of the Northwest Arctic Borough. The CHAPs, who work in village-based clinics, are trained in basic health assessment and can treat common illnesses. For more complicated cases, the CHAPs communicate with Maniilaq Health Center medical staff via phone, video-conference, and digital images.

=== Media ===
The Arctic Sounder is a weekly newspaper published by Alaska Media, LLC, which covers Kotzebue and the rest of the Northwest Arctic Borough along with the North Slope Borough (and its hub community of Utqiagvik).

KOTZ, broadcasting at 720 on the AM dial, is the public radio station serving Kotzebue, one of two Class A clear-channel stations in the United States at that frequency (the other being Chicago's WGN). KOTZ operates an extensive translator network serving the rest of the borough.

== Education ==
Northwest Arctic Borough School District operates two schools in Kotzebue: June Nelson Elementary School (JNES) and Kotzebue Middle High School (KMHS). As of 2017 they had 394 and 309 students, making them the largest schools in the district.

There is one private school run by the Native Village of Kotzebue called Nikaitchuat Iḷisaġviat. It is an Inupiaq language immersion school for grades PK through one.

University of Alaska Fairbanks (UAF) operates its Chukchi Campus, which offers classes and other community services.

== Notable people ==
- Willie Hensley (born 1941), former state Representative, former state Senator, one of the key founders of NANA Regional Corporation, instrumental in the passage of the Alaska Native Claims Settlement Act
- Reggie Joule (born 1952), who represented Kotzebue and surrounding area in the Alaska House of Representatives for eight terms followed by a single term as borough mayor, achieved minor national fame during the 1970s and 1980s for his exploits in the World Eskimo Indian Olympics, including two appearances on The Tonight Show Starring Johnny Carson
- Seth Kantner, novelist
- John Lincoln (born 1981), member of the Alaska House of Representatives
- Segundo Llorente (1906–1989), Spanish-born Jesuit, philosopher, author and politician
- Adam Stennett (born 1972), painter
- John Baker (c. 1962), winner of the 2011 Iditarod Trail Sled Dog Race

== Toxins ==
Although no "toxic releases" come from within the bounds of Kotzebue, the methods used by the U.S. Environmental Protection Agency (EPA)'s in their Toxic Releases Inventory (TRI) reports that in 2016, Kotzebue "produced" 756 million pounds of toxins.(Due to the way the EPA defines toxins, even the discharge of filtered and pH balanced water is called a toxin.) The TRI placed Kotzebue as the most toxic place in the United States. The second most toxic was Bingham Canyon, Utah at 200 million pounds of toxins. However, as National Geographic explains, the source of the toxins is not Kotzebue, but Alaska's Red Dog mine. Since the mine is located in a remote area in Alaska, the toxic release is linked to the nearest "city"— Kotzebue. The EPA says that when a "facility" is "not located in a city, town, village, or similar entity will often list a nearby city." National Geographic says that, "All 756 million pounds of toxic chemicals attributed to "Kotzebue" on the TRI dataset came from one of the world's largest zinc and lead mines, the Red Dog mine, which is located about 80 miles north of Kotzebue." At the county level the Northwest Arctic of Alaska leads the list with 756,000,000 pounds of toxins. The state of Alaska produces three times more toxins than every other American state—834 million pounds.
