= Maniilaq Association =

Northwest Alaska nonprofit

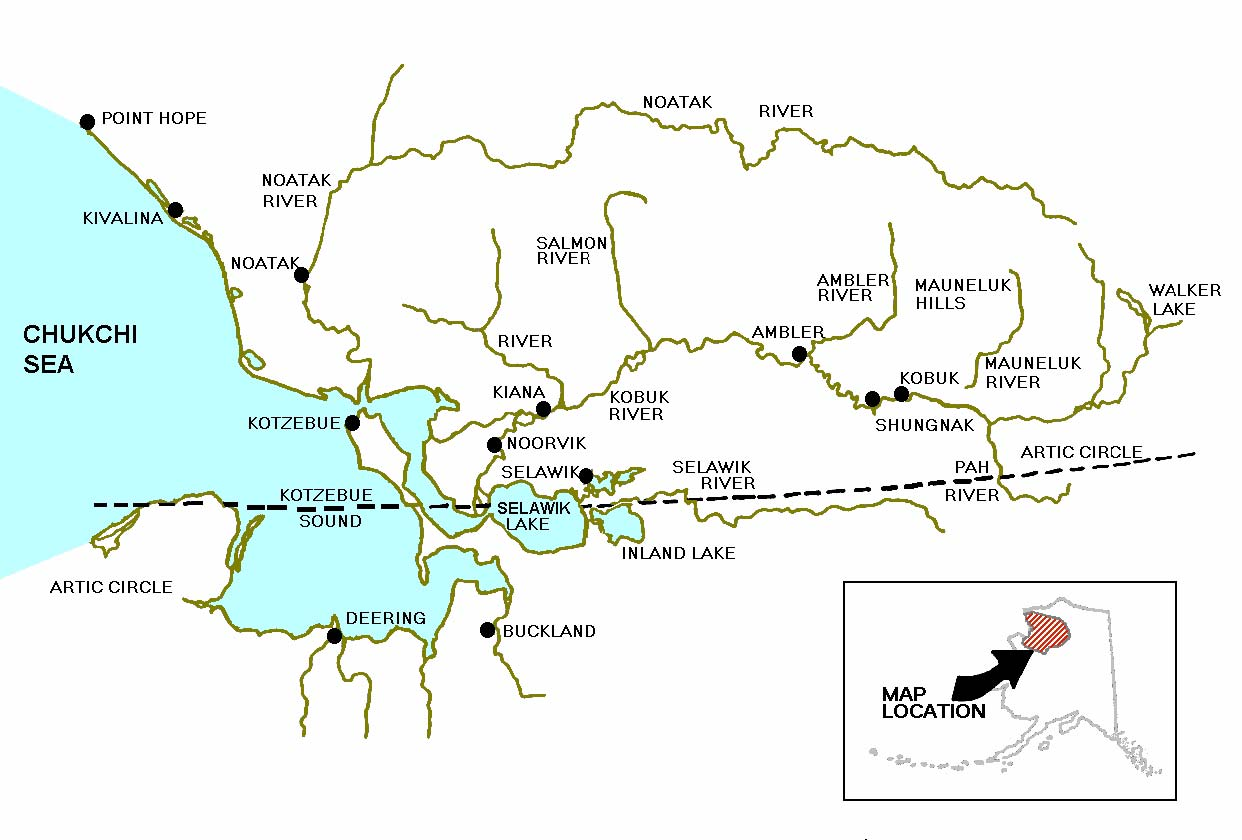
- Communities served by Maniilaq
- Formation: July 6, 1966; 59 years ago
- Headquarters: 733 2nd Ave, Kotzeube, Alaska
- Region served: Northwest Arctic Borough; Point Hope
- President: Tim Gilbert
- Board Chair: Floyd Ticket
- Board of directors: Board
- Affiliations: Alaska Native Tribal Health Consortium
- R.O.R. Id: 04syg1z63
- Website: maniilaq.org
- Formerly called: Northwest Alaska Native Association

The Maniilaq Association is a tribally-operated health and social services organization serving the Northwest Arctic Borough and the North Slope community of Point Hope. Maniilaq has over 500 employees and is the largest employer in the region.

== Etymology ==
"Maniiḷaq" is a word in the Iñupiaq language meaning "without money", reflecting the organization's nonprofit status. It is also the name of an early nineteenth century prophet who lived in the region.

== History ==
The Northwest Alaska Native Association (NANA) was formed in 1966 to advocate for the land claims of the Native people of the northwest arctic. After the passage of the Alaska Native Claims Settlement Act in 1971, NANA was renamed to the Mauneluk Association to avoid confusion with the new, for-profit NANA Regional Corporation. This spelling was later changed, giving the organization its current name.

In 1975, Maniilaq merged with the Kotzebue Area Health Corporation, which had been formed in 1973.

Between 1980 and 1981, Maniilaq underwent a significant expansion with the construction of a new health facility in Kotzeube. Maniilaq assumed management of the Indian Health Service's local hospital program on July 1, 1988.

== Maniilaq Health Center ==
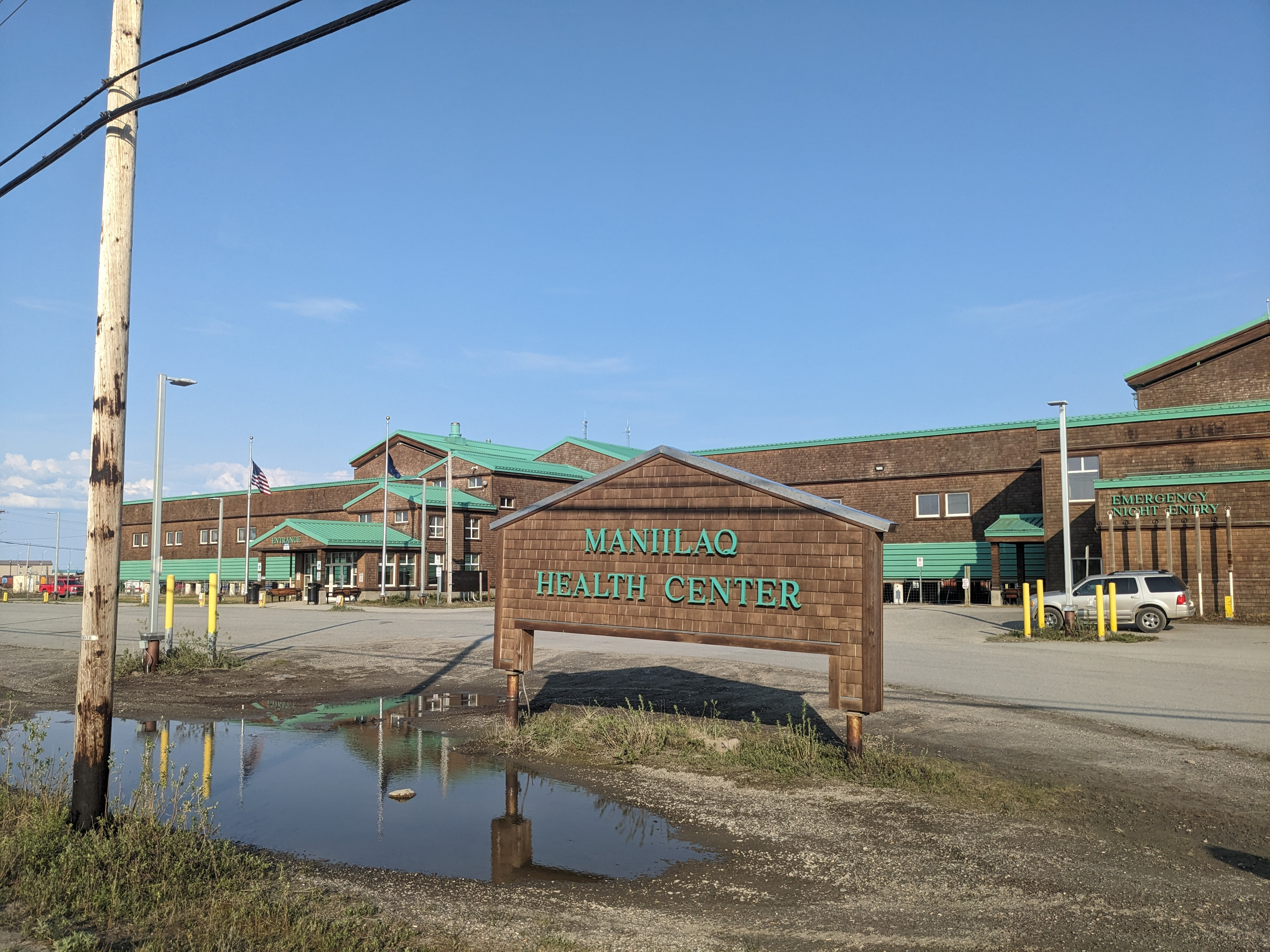
Maniilaq Health Center in 2025

Maniilaq Health Center in Kotzebue is the primary health care facility for the residents of the Northwest Arctic Borough and Point Hope. The 80,000 square foot hospital houses facilities to provide primary, emergency, psychiatric, dental, and long-term care, as well as an inpatient wing with 17 beds for recovering patients.

== Village clinics ==
Maniilaq operates clinics in 11 outlying villages. These villages are staffed by Community Health Aide Practitioners (CHAPs), who are trained in basic health assessment and can treat common illnesses or use the Community Health Aide Manual to determine the best course of action. For more complicated cases, the CHAPs communicate with Maniilaq Health Center medical staff.
