= NANA Regional Corporation =

Alaska Native Regional Corporation

NANA Regional Corporation, Inc. (NANA) is one of thirteen Alaska Native Regional Corporations created under the Alaska Native Claims Settlement Act of 1971 (ANCSA) in settlement of Alaska Native land claims. NANA was incorporated in Alaska on June 7, 1972. NANA is a for-profit corporation with a land base in the Kotzebue area in northwest Alaska. Its corporate office is in Kotzebue, Alaska. NANA's Alaska Native shareholders are of Inupiat descent.

The Northwest Arctic Native Association (now the Maniilaq Association) was NANA's predecessor, and played a key role in the effort to resolve Alaska Native land claims that led to passage of ANCSA. However, NANA is not an acronym today.

According to the 2021 Arctic Environmental Responsibility Index (AERI), NANA Regional Corporation is ranked no. 20 among 120 oil, gas, and mining companies involved in resource extraction north of the Arctic Circle.

== History ==
In 2015, NANA spilled 61 barrels of oil (2,561 gallons) onto the wet tundra of Alaska, where it flowed 200 yards into a nearby stream. The EPA fined NANA $24,500 for this act of pollution and they were forced to pay approximately $2,000,000 in compliance costs.

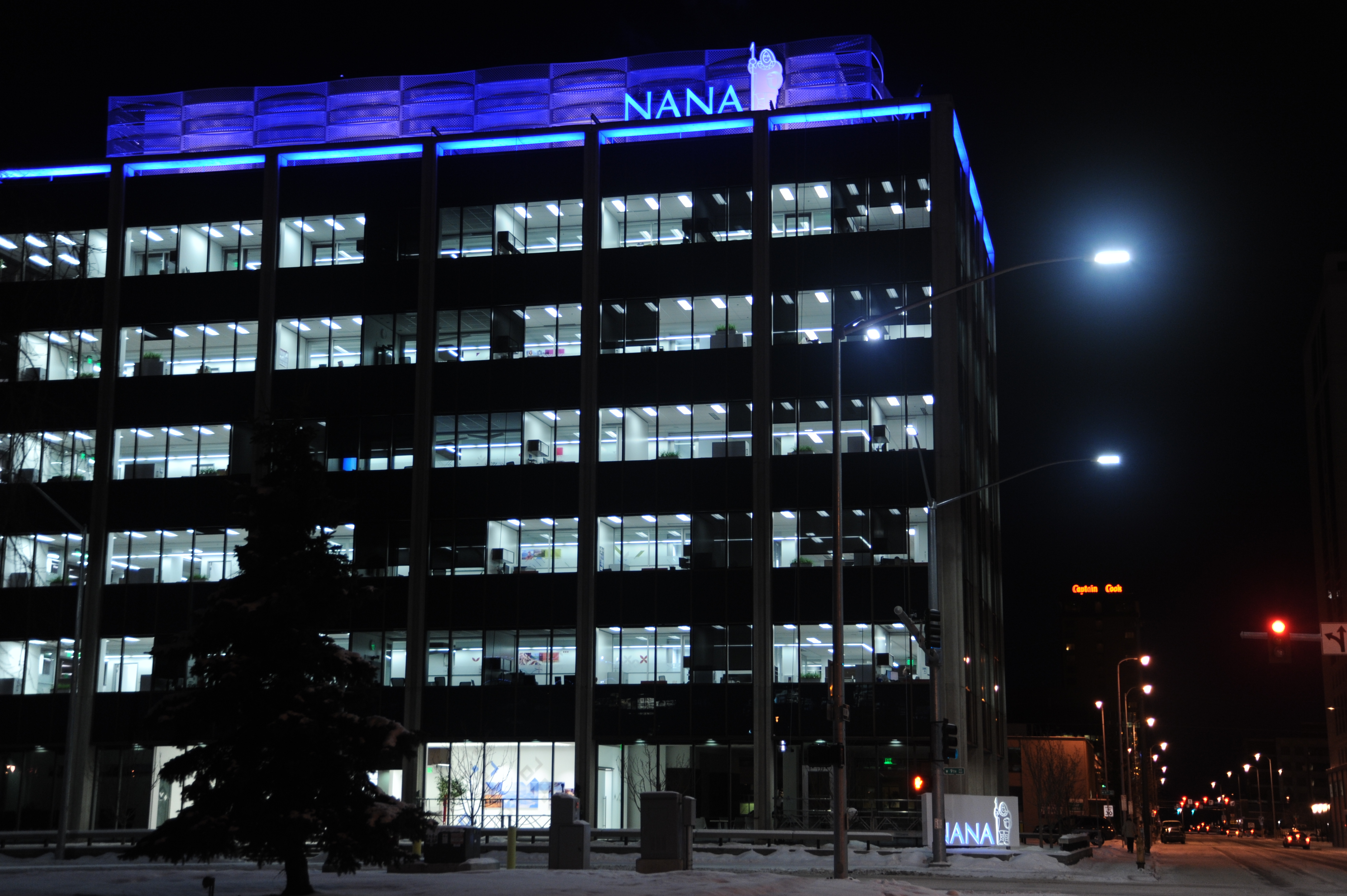
NANA Regional Corporation is headquartered in Kotzebue but maintains offices in downtown Anchorage for a number of departments and subsidiaries, including the headquarters of NANA Development Corporation. The building, situated at the corner of Ninth Avenue and I Street and constructed in 1969, formerly housed oil company offices and the Japanese consulate office.

== Corporate governance ==
=== Board of directors ===
NANA is a shareholder-managed corporation that is guided by a board of directors, composed of Inupiat shareholders, and a senior management team. The 23 member NANA Regional Corporation, Inc. Board is elected solely by NANA shareholders. It is made up of two Iñupiat shareholder board members from each NANA village (with the exception of Kotzebue with one board seat) and an Elder Advisor.

=== Shareholders ===
Most of NANA's approximately 15,000 shareholders are Alaska Natives of Inupiat descent. As an ANCSA corporation, NANA has no publicly traded stock and its shares cannot legally be sold, though Class A, B and C stocks can be inherited or gifted. Unlike other American corporations, NANA - as an Alaska Native Corporation, has economic, social and cultural responsibilities to its shareholders.

== Lands ==
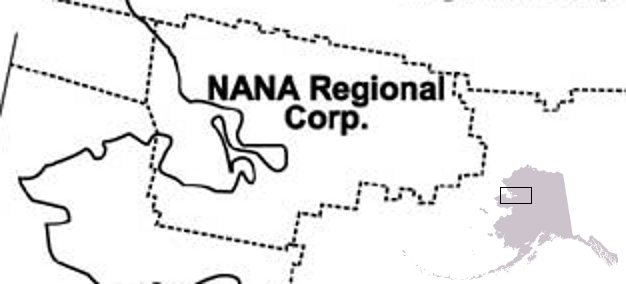
Map showing NANA's region, with an inset showing the region in relation to Alaska as a whole. Adjacent regions are those of Arctic Slope Regional Corporation (to the north), Bering Straits Native Corporation (to the south) and Doyon, Limited (to the east).

NANA owns 2,280,000 acres (9,200 km^{2}), or approximately 9.4 percent of the 24,300,000 acres (98,000 km^{2}) that comprise the NANA region.

In 1972, a merger of the area’s regional corporation and ten of the eleven village corporations resulted in NANA’s ownership of both the surface and subsurface acreage, with the exception of the surface acreage Kikiktagruk Iñupiat Corporation (KIC) retained.

NANA-owned lands are managed by the NANA Lands and Regional Affairs Department.

== Subsidiaries ==
NANA subsidiaries include:

- NANA Development Corporation (NDC) oversees NANA business activity and cultivates developmental opportunities for NANA shareholders.
- Red Dog mine. Northwest Arctic Region of Alaska. Zinc mine on NANA-owned land; operated in partnership with Teck Alaska. Many of NANA's companies and partners provide services for the mine, such as facilities management, housekeeping and food service.

=== Akima ===
Akima Global Services is a holding company of federal and commercial service providers, headquarter in Herndon, Virginia and owned jointly by NANA and The Aleut Corporation. Classified as a small business, it is responsible for much of NANA's revenue; according to the cooperation, in 2024, it was responsible for $2.2 billion of NANA's $2.8 billion revenue.

In 2017, Akima fired an employee who had posted a picture of herself flipping off Donald Trump and his motorcade on her personal social media, unconnected to Akima. She sued for wrongful termination, alleging that another employee had also posted obscene political messages relating to Black Lives Matter but was not fired. She also claimed that the company had breached its contract relating to severance pay; in 2018, the wrongful termination part of her lawsuit was dismissed by the Virginia courts.

In the 2010s and 2020s, Akima subsidiaries were responsible for running migrant detention facilities in states such as Texas, New York, Florida, and Arizona. A 2023 audit and 2024 report by the Department of Homeland Security found that Akima Global Services' guards had used broken regulations about the use of physical force against detainees their Texas and Florida centers, and condemned the solitary confinement unit in Texas for safety reasons. The facility in New York was also subject to civil rights complaints. In August 2024, Akima Infrastructure Protection was contracted by ICE to run a detention center for immigrants in Guantánamo Bay. In response, several shareholders surveyed other NANA shareholders and called for the leadership to "immediately end all relations with ICE and detention centers". In response, the chair of the board of directors said that Akima staff worked in accordance with Iñupiaq values and denied that they would mistreat anybody.

Operated by Akima, the ICE-owned Krome North Service Processing Center in Miami, Florida was reported to have exceeded its contractual capacity by almost 200%, in April 2025, resulting in additional temporary structures; detainees of the facility formed a human SOS sign in its yard two months later, in a plea for humanitarian assistance.
