= RYL =

RYL or Ryl may refer to:

- Royal Air Philippines (ICAO airline code RYL), a 2020s Philippines-based airline
- Royal Air (ICAO airline code RYL), a defunct 2000s Benin-based airline
- Royal Airstrip (IATA airport code RYL), Lower Zambezi National Park, Zambia; see List of airports by IATA airport code: R
- John Rylands Research Institute and Library (bibliographic manuscript code Ryl), University of Manchester, Deansgate, Manchester, England, UK
- Republican Youth Library (ryl.az), Baku, Azerbaijan; see Libraries in Baku
- Radical Youth League (RYL), Maoist Communist Party of India
- Ryl (Japanese: リル, romanized: Riru), a Jewelpet, a toy pig and fictional character; see List of Jewelpets and Sweetspets
- The Ryls, a fictional species created by Frank L. Baum for his world of Oz; first appearing in the 1902 The Life and Adventures of Santa Claus
- Ryl Company, an iced tea manufacturer.

== See also ==
- RIL (disambiguation)
- Ryle (disambiguation)
- Rille (disambiguation)
- Rill
- Rilès
