= List of airports by IATA code: R =

IATA	ICAO	Airport name	Location served	Time	DST
-RA-
RAA		Rakanda Airport	Rakanda, Papua New Guinea		
RAB	AYTK	Rabaul Airport (Tokua Airport)	Rabaul, Papua New Guinea		
RAC	KRAC	John H. Batten Airport	Racine, Wisconsin, United States		
RAD		Road Town Seaplane Base	Tortola, British Overseas Territory of Virgin Islands		
RAE	OERR	Arar Domestic Airport	Arar, Saudi Arabia		
RAF	SAFR	Rafaela Airport	Rafaela, Santa Fe, Argentina		
RAG	NZRA	Raglan Aerodrome	Raglan, New Zealand		
RAH	OERF	Rafha Domestic Airport	Rafha, Saudi Arabia		
RAI	GVNP	Nelson Mandela International Airport	Praia, Cape Verde		
RAJ	VARK	Rajkot Airport	Rajkot, Gujarat, India		
RAK	GMMX	Marrakesh Menara Airport	Marrakesh, Morocco		
RAL	KRAL	Riverside Municipal Airport	Riverside, California, United States		
RAM	YRNG	Ramingining Airport	Ramingining, Northern Territory, Australia		
RAN	LIDR	Ravenna Airport	Ravenna, Emilia-Romagna, Italy		
RAO	SBRP	Leite Lopes Airport	Ribeirão Preto, São Paulo, Brazil		
RAP	KRAP	Rapid City Regional Airport	Rapid City, South Dakota, United States		
RAQ	WAWR	Sugimanuru Airport	Muna Island, Indonesia		
RAR	NCRG	Rarotonga International Airport	Avarua, Rarotonga, Cook Islands		
RAS	OIGG	Rasht Airport	Rasht, Iran		
RAT	USNR	Raduzhny Airport	Raduzhny, Khanty-Mansi Autonomous Okrug, Russia		
RAV	SKCN	Cravo Norte Airport	Cravo Norte, Colombia		
RAW		Arawa Airport	Arawa, Papua New Guinea		
RAX	AYYO	Oram Airport	Oram, Papua New Guinea		
RAZ	OPRT	Rawalakot Airport	Rawalakot, Pakistan		
-RB-
RBA	GMME	Rabat–Salé Airport	Rabat, Morocco		
RBB	SWBR	Borba Airport	Borba, Amazonas, Brazil		
RBC	YROI	Robinvale Airport	Robinvale, Victoria, Australia		
RBD	KRBD	Dallas Executive Airport	Dallas, Texas, United States	UTC−06:00	Mar-Nov
RBE	VDRK	Ratanakiri Airport	Ratanakiri, Cambodia		
RBF		Big Bear City Airport (FAA: L35)	Big Bear City, California, United States		
RBG	KRBG	Roseburg Regional Airport	Roseburg, Oregon, United States		
RBI	NFFR	Rabi Airport	Rabi Island, Fiji		
RBJ	RJCR	Rebun Airport	Rebun, Rebun Island, Japan	UTC+09:00	
RBK		French Valley Airport (FAA: F70)	Murrieta / Temecula, California, United States		
RBL	KRBL	Red Bluff Municipal Airport	Red Bluff, California, United States		
RBM	EDMS	Straubing Wallmühle Airport	Straubing, Bavaria, Germany		
RBO	SLRB	Roboré Airport	Roboré, Bolivia		
RBP	AYRE	Rabaraba Airport	Rabaraba, Papua New Guinea		
RBQ	SLRQ	Rurrenabaque Airport	Rurrenabaque, Bolivia		
RBR	SBRB	Plácido de Castro International Airport	Rio Branco, Acre, Brazil		
RBS	YORB	Orbost Airport	Orbost, Victoria, Australia		
RBT	HKMB	Marsabit Airport	Marsabit, Kenya		
RBU	YROE	Roebourne Airport	Roebourne, Western Australia, Australia		
RBV	AGRM	Ramata Airport	Ramata Island, Solomon Islands		
RBW	KRBW	Lowcountry Regional Airport	Walterboro, South Carolina, United States		
RBX	HSMK	Rumbek Airport	Rumbek, South Sudan		
RBY	PARY	Ruby Airport	Ruby, Alaska, United States		
-RC-
RCA	KRCA	Ellsworth Air Force Base	Rapid City, South Dakota, United States		
RCB	FARB	Richards Bay Airport	Richards Bay, South Africa		
RCE		Roche Harbor Seaplane Base	Roche Harbor, Washington, United States		
RCH	SKRH	Almirante Padilla Airport	Riohacha, Colombia		
RCK	KRCK	H. H. Coffield Regional Airport	Rockdale, Texas, United States		
RCL	NVSR	Redcliffe Airport	Redcliffe, Aoba Island, Vanuatu		
RCM	YRMD	Richmond Airport	Richmond, Queensland, Australia		
RCN		American River Airport	American River, South Australia, Australia		
RCO	LFDN	Rochefort – Saint-Agnant Airport	Rochefort, Poitou-Charentes, France		
RCQ	SATR	Reconquista Airport	Reconquista, Santa Fe, Argentina		
RCR	KRCR	Fulton County Airport	Rochester, Indiana, United States		
RCS	EGTO	Rochester Airport	Rochester, England, United Kingdom		
RCT	KRCT	Nartron Field	Reed City, Michigan, United States		
RCU	SAOC	Las Higueras Airport	Río Cuarto, Córdoba, Argentina		
RCY	MYRP	Port Nelson Airport	Port Nelson, Rum Cay Island, Bahamas		
-RD-
RDA	YRKD	Rockhampton Downs Airport	Rockhampton Downs, Northern Territory, Australia		
RDB	PADG	Red Dog Airport	Red Dog, Alaska, United States		
RDC	SNDC	Redenção Airport	Redenção, Pará, Brazil		
RDD	KRDD	Redding Municipal Airport	Redding, California, United States		
RDE		Merdey Airport (Jahabra Airport)	Merdey, Indonesia		
RDG	KRDG	Reading Regional Airport (Carl A. Spaatz Field)	Reading, Pennsylvania, United States		
RDM	KRDM	Roberts Field	Redmond / Bend, Oregon, United States		
RDN	WMPR	Redang Airport	Redang Island, Terengganu, Malaysia		
RDO	EPRA	Radom Airport	Radom, Poland		
RDP	VEDG	Kazi Nazrul Islam Airport	Durgapur, West Bengal, India		
RDR	KRDR	Grand Forks Air Force Base	Grand Forks, North Dakota, United States		
RDS	SAHS	Rincón de los Sauces Airport	Rincón de los Sauces, Neuquén, Argentina		
RDT	GOSR	Richard Toll Airport	Richard Toll, Senegal		
RDU	KRDU	Raleigh–Durham International Airport	Raleigh / Durham, North Carolina, United States		
RDV		Red Devil Airport	Red Devil, Alaska, United States		
RDZ	LFCR	Rodez–Marcillac Airport	Rodez, Midi-Pyrénées, France		
-RE-
REA	NTGE	Reao Airport	Reao, Tuamotus, French Polynesia		
REB	EDAX	Rechlin–Lärz Airfield	Rechlin, Mecklenburg-Vorpommern, Germany		
REC	SBRF	Recife/Guararapes–Gilberto Freyre International Airport	Recife, Pernambuco, Brazil		
RED	KRVL	Mifflin County Airport (FAA: RVL)	Reedsville / Lewistown, Pennsylvania, United States		
REE		Reese Airpark (FAA: 8XS8)	Lubbock, Texas, United States		
REG	LICR	Reggio di Calabria Airport	Reggio di Calabria, Calabria, Italy		
REI	SOOR	Régina Airport	Régina, French Guiana		
REK	BIRK	metropolitan area^{1}	Reykjavík, Iceland		
REL	SAVT	Almirante Marcos A. Zar Airport	Trelew, Chubut, Argentina		
REN	UWOO	Orenburg Tsentralny Airport	Orenburg, Orenburg Oblast, Russia		
REO	KREO	Rome State Airport	Rome, Oregon, United States		
REP	VDSR	Siem Reap International Airport (Angkor Int'l)	Siem Reap, Cambodia		
REQ		Reko Diq Airport	Reko Diq, Pakistan		
RER	MGRT	Retalhuleu Airport	Retalhuleu, Guatemala		
RES	SARE	Resistencia International Airport	Resistencia, Chaco, Argentina		
RET	ENRS	Røst Airport	Røst, Norway		
REU	LERS	Reus Airport	Reus, Catalonia, Spain		
REW		Churhata Airport	Rewa, Madhya Pradesh, India		
REX	MMRX	General Lucio Blanco International Airport	Reynosa, Tamaulipas, Mexico		
REY	SLRY	Reyes Airport	Reyes, Bolivia		
REZ	SDRS	Resende Airport	Resende, Rio de Janeiro, Brazil		
-RF-
RFA	FEGR	Rafaï Airport	Rafaï, Central African Republic		
RFD	KRFD	Chicago Rockford International Airport (Greater Rockford Airport)	Rockford, Illinois, United States		
RFG	KRFG	Rooke Field	Refugio, Texas, United States		
RFK		Rollang Field (FAA: 5MS1)	Rolling Fork, Mississippi, United States		
RFN	BIRG	Raufarhöfn Airport	Raufarhöfn, Iceland		
RFP	NTTR	Raiatea Airport (Uturoa Airport)	Raiatea, Society Islands, French Polynesia		
RFR	MRRF	Río Frío Airport	Río Frío, Costa Rica		
RFS	MNRT	Rosita Airport	Rosita, Nicaragua		
-RG-
RGA	SAWE	Hermes Quijada International Airport	Río Grande, Tierra del Fuego, Argentina		
RGE		Porgera Airport	Porgera, Papua New Guinea		
RGH	VEBG	Balurghat Airport	Balurghat, West Bengal, India		
RGI	NTTG	Rangiroa Airport	Rangiroa, Tuamotus, French Polynesia		
RGK	UNBG	Gorno-Altaysk Airport	Gorno-Altaysk, Altai Republic, Russia		
RGL	SAWG	Piloto Civil Norberto Fernández International Airport	Río Gallegos, Santa Cruz, Argentina		
RGN	VYYY	Yangon International Airport	Yangon, Myanmar		
RGO	ZKHM	Chongjin Airport	Chongjin, North Korea		
RGR		Ranger Municipal Airport (FAA: F23)	Ranger, Texas, United States		
RGS	LEBG	Burgos Airport	Burgos, Castile and León, Spain		
RGT	WIPR	Japura Airport	Rengat, Indonesia		
-RH-
RHA	BIRE	Reykhólar Airport	Reykhólar, Iceland		
RHD	SANR	Termas de Río Hondo Airport	Termas de Río Hondo, Santiago del Estero, Argentina		
RHE	LFSR	Reims – Champagne Air Base	Reims, Champagne-Ardenne, France		
RHG	HRYU	Ruhengeri Airport	Ruhengeri, Rwanda		
RHI	KRHI	Rhinelander–Oneida County Airport	Rhinelander, Wisconsin, United States		
RHL	YRYH	Roy Hill Station Airport	Roy Hill Station, Western Australia, Australia		
RHN	FYSA	Skorpion Mine Airport	Rosh Pinah, Namibia		
RHO	LGRP	Rhodes International Airport	Rhodes, Greece		
RHP	VNRC	Ramechhap Airport	Ramechhap, Nepal		
RHR		Al Hamra Seaplane Base	Ras al-Khaimah, United Arab Emirates		
RHT		Alxa Right Banner Badanjilin Airport	Alxa Right Banner, Inner Mongolia, China	UTC+08:00	
RHV	KRHV	Reid–Hillview Airport of Santa Clara County	San Jose, California, United States		
-RI-
RIA	SBSM	Santa Maria Airport	Santa Maria, Rio Grande do Sul, Brazil		
RIB	SLRI	Riberalta Airport	Riberalta, Bolivia		
RIC	KRIC	Richmond International Airport	Richmond, Virginia, United States		
RID	KRID	Richmond Municipal Airport	Richmond, Indiana, United States		
RIE	KRPD	Rice Lake Regional Airport (Carl's Field) (FAA: RPD)	Rice Lake, Wisconsin, United States		
RIF	KRIF	Richfield Municipal Airport	Richfield, Utah, United States		
RIG	SBRG	Rio Grande Regional Airport	Rio Grande, Rio Grande do Sul, Brazil		
RIH	MPSM	Scarlett Martinez International Airport	Río Hato, Panama		
RIJ	SPJA	Juan Simons Vela Airport	Rioja, Peru		
RIL	KRIL	Garfield County Regional Airport	Rifle, Colorado, United States		
RIM	SPLN	San Nicolas Airport	Rodríguez de Mendoza, Peru		
RIN	AGRC	Ringgi Cove Airport	Ringgi Cove, Solomon Islands		
RIO		metropolitan area^{2}	Rio de Janeiro, Brazil		
RIR	KRIR	Flabob Airport	Riverside, California, United States		
RIS	RJER	Rishiri Airport	Rishiri, Rishiri Island, Japan	UTC+09:00	
RIV	KRIV	March Air Reserve Base	Riverside, California, United States		
RIW	KRIW	Central Wyoming Regional Airport	Riverton, Wyoming, United States		
RIX	EVRA	Riga International Airport	Riga, Latvia		
RIY	OYRN	Riyan Airport	Mukalla, Yemen		
RIZ		Rizhao Shanzihe Airport	Rizhao, Shandong, China	UTC+08:00	
-RJ-
RJA	VORY	Rajahmundry Airport	Rajahmundry, Andhra Pradesh, India		
RJB	VNRB	Rajbiraj Airport	Rajbiraj, Nepal		
RJH	VGRJ	Shah Makhdum Airport	Rajshahi, Bangladesh		
RJI		Rajouri Airport	Rajouri, Jammu and Kashmir, India		
RJK	LDRI	Rijeka Airport	Rijeka, Croatia		
RJL	LELO	Logroño–Agoncillo Airport	Logroño, La Rioja, Spain		
RJM		Marinda Airport	Waisai, Indonesia		
RJN	OIKR	Rafsanjan Airport	Rafsanjan, Iran		
-RK-
RKA	NTKK	Aratika-Nord Airport	Aratika, Tuamotus, French Polynesia		
RKD	KRKD	Knox County Regional Airport	Rockland, Maine, United States		
RKE	EKRK	Roskilde Airport	Copenhagen, Denmark		
RKH	KUZA	Rock Hill/York County Airport (FAA: UZA)	Rock Hill, South Carolina, United States		
RKI	WIBR	Rokot Airport	Sipura, Indonesia		
RKP	KRKP	Aransas County Airport	Rockport, Texas, United States		
RKR	KRKR	Robert S. Kerr Airport	Poteau, Oklahoma, United States		
RKS	KRKS	Rock Springs–Sweetwater County Airport	Rock Springs, Wyoming, United States		
RKT	OMRK	Ras Al Khaimah International Airport	Ras al-Khaimah, United Arab Emirates		
RKU		Kairuku Airport	Yule Island, Papua New Guinea		
RKV	BIRK	Reykjavík Airport	Reykjavík, Iceland		
RKW	KRKW	Rockwood Municipal Airport	Rockwood, Tennessee, United States		
RKY		Rokeby Airport	Rokeby, Queensland, Australia		
RKZ	ZURK	Shigatse Peace Airport	Shigatse, Tibet Autonomous Region, China	UTC+08:00	
-RL-
RLD	KRLD	Richland Airport	Richland, Washington, United States		
RLG	ETNL	Rostock–Laage Airport	Rostock, Mecklenburg-Vorpommern, Germany		
RLK	ZBYZ	Bayannur Tianjitai Airport	Bayannur, Inner Mongolia, China	UTC+08:00	
RLO	SAOS	Valle del Conlara Airport	Villa de Merlo, San Luis, Argentina		
RLP		Rosella Plains Airport	Rosella Plains, Queensland, Australia		
RLR		Relais de la Reine Airport	Isalo, Madagascar		
RLT	DRZL	Arlit Airport	Arlit, Niger		
-RM-
RMA	YROM	Roma Airport	Roma, Queensland, Australia		
RMB	OOBR	Buraimi Airport	Buraimi, Oman		
RMD	VORG	Ramagundam Airport (Basanth Nagar Airport)	Ramagundam, Telangana, India		
RME	KRME	Griffiss International Airport	Rome, New York, United States		
RMF	HEMA	Marsa Alam International Airport	Marsa Alam, Egypt		
RMG	KRMG	Richard B. Russell Airport	Rome, Georgia, United States		
RMI	LIPR	Federico Fellini International Airport	Rimini, Emilia-Romagna, Italy		
RMK	YREN	Renmark Airport	Renmark, South Australia, Australia		
RML	VCCC	Colombo International Airport, Ratmalana	Colombo, Sri Lanka	UTC+05:30	
RMN		Rumginae Airport	Rumginae, Papua New Guinea		
RMO	LUKK	Chișinău Eugen Doga International Airport	Chișinău, Moldova	UTC+02:00	
RMP	PFMP	Rampart Airport	Rampart, Alaska, United States		
RMQ	RCMQ	Taichung Airport (Taichung Ching Chuan Kang Airport)	Taichung, Taiwan		
RMS	ETAR	Ramstein Air Base	Ramstein, Rhineland-Palatinate, Germany		
RMT	NTAM	Rimatara Airport	Rimatara, Austral Islands, French Polynesia		
RMU	LEMI	Región de Murcia International Airport	Murcia / Cartagena, Murcia, Spain		
RMY	KMPI	Mariposa-Yosemite Airport (FAA: MPI)	Mariposa, California, United States		
-RN-
RNA	AGAR	Ulawa Airport	Arona, Ulawa Island, Solomon Islands		
RNB	ESDF	Ronneby Airport	Ronneby / Karlskrona, Sweden		
RNC	KRNC	Warren County Memorial Airport	McMinnville, Tennessee, United States		
RND	KRND	Randolph Air Force Base	San Antonio, Texas, United States		
RNE	LFLO	Roanne Renaison Airport	Roanne, Rhône-Alpes, France		
RNG		Rangely Airport (FAA: 4V0)	Rangely, Colorado, United States		
RNH	KRNH	New Richmond Regional Airport	New Richmond, Wisconsin, United States		
RNI	MNCI	Corn Island Airport	Corn Islands, Nicaragua		
RNJ	RORY	Yoron Airport	Yoronjima, Amami Islands, Japan	UTC+09:00	
RNL	AGGR	Rennell/Tingoa Airport	Rennell Island, Solomon Islands		
RNM	OOGB	Qarn Alam Airport	Qarn Alam, Oman		
RNN	EKRN	Bornholm Airport	Rønne, Denmark		
RNO	KRNO	Reno–Tahoe International Airport	Reno, Nevada, United States		
RNP		Rongelap Airport	Rongelap Atoll, Marshall Islands		
RNR		Robinson River Airport	Robinson River, Papua New Guinea		
RNS	LFRN	Rennes–Saint-Jacques Airport	Rennes, Brittany, France		
RNT	KRNT	Renton Municipal Airport	Renton, Washington, United States		
RNU	WBKR	Ranau Airport	Ranau, Sabah, Malaysia		
RNZ	KRZL	Jasper County Airport (FAA: RZL)	Rensselaer, Indiana, United States		
-RO-
ROA	KROA	Roanoke–Blacksburg Regional Airport (Woodrum Field)	Roanoke, Virginia, United States		
ROB	GLRB	Roberts International Airport	Monrovia, Liberia		
ROC	KROC	Greater Rochester International Airport	Rochester, New York, United States		
ROD	FARS	Robertson Airfield	Robertson, South Africa		
ROF		Montague Airport (Yreka Rohrer Field) (FAA: 1O5)	Montague / Yreka, California, United States		
ROG	KROG	Rogers Municipal Airport (Carter Field)	Rogers, Arkansas, United States		
ROH	YROB	Robinhood Airport	Robinhood, Queensland, Australia		
ROI	VTUV	Roi Et Airport	Roi Et, Thailand		
ROK	YBRK	Rockhampton Airport	Rockhampton, Queensland, Australia		
ROL		Roosevelt Municipal Airport	Roosevelt, Utah, United States		
ROM		metropolitan area^{3}	Rome, Lazio, Italy		
RON	SKPA	Juan José Rondón Airport	Paipa, Colombia		
ROO	SWRD	Maestro Marinho Franco Airport	Rondonópolis, Mato Grosso, Brazil		
ROP	PGRO	Rota International Airport (FAA: GRO)	Rota, Northern Mariana Islands		
ROR	PTRO	Roman Tmetuchl International Airport	Koror, Palau		
ROS	SAAR	Rosario – Islas Malvinas International Airport	Rosario, Santa Fe, Argentina		
ROT	NZRO	Rotorua Regional Airport	Rotorua, New Zealand		
ROU	LBRS	Ruse Airport	Ruse, Bulgaria		
ROV	URRP	Platov International Airport	Novocherkassk, Rostov Oblast, Russia		
ROW	KROW	Roswell International Air Center	Roswell, New Mexico, United States		
ROX	KROX	Roseau Municipal Airport (Rudy Billberg Field)	Roseau, Minnesota, United States		
ROY	SAWM	Río Mayo Airport	Río Mayo, Chubut, Argentina		
ROZ	LERT	US Naval Station Rota	Rota, Andalusia, Spain		
-RP-
RPA	VNRP	Rolpa Airport	Rolpa, Nepal		
RPB	YRRB	Roper Bar Airport	Roper Bar, Northern Territory, Australia		
RPI	WAFK	Rampi Airport	Rampi, Indonesia		
RPM	YNGU	Ngukurr Airport	Ngukurr, Northern Territory, Australia		
RPN	LLIB	Rosh Pina Airport	Rosh Pinna, Israel		
RPR	VARP	Swami Vivekananda Airport	Raipur, Chhattisgarh, India		
RPV		Roper Valley Airport	Roper Valley, Northern Territory, Australia		
RPX	KRPX	Roundup Airport	Roundup, Montana, United States		
-RQ-
RQA	ZWRQ	Ruoqiang Loulan Airport	Ruoqiang, Xinjiang, China	UTC+08:00	
RQW		Qayyarah Airfield West	Qayyarah, Iraq		
RQY	VOSH	Shivamogga Airport	Shivamogga, Karnataka, India	UTC+05:30	
-RR-
RRE		Marree Airport	Marree, South Australia, Australia		
RRG	FIMR	Sir Gaëtan Duval Airport	Rodrigues Island, Mauritius		
RRI		Barora Airport	Barora, Solomon Islands		
RRJ	SBJR	Jacarepaguá Airport	Barra da Tijuca, Rio de Janeiro, Brazil		
RRK	VERK	Rourkela Airport	Rourkela, Odisha, India		
RRL	KRRL	Merrill Municipal Airport	Merrill, Wisconsin, United States		
RRM		Marromeu Airport	Marromeu, Mozambique		
RRR	NTKO	Raroia Airport	Raroia, Tuamotus, French Polynesia		
RRS	ENRO	Røros Airport	Røros, Norway		
RRT	KRRT	Warroad International Memorial Airport (Swede Carlson Field)	Warroad, Minnesota, United States		
RRV		Robinson River Airport	Robinson River, Northern Territory, Australia		
-RS-
RSA	SAZR	Santa Rosa Airport	Santa Rosa, La Pampa, Argentina		
RSB		Roseberth Airport	Roseberth, Queensland, Australia		
RSD	MYER	Rock Sound International Airport	Rock Sound, Eleuthera Island, Bahamas		
RSE		Rose Bay Water Airport	Sydney, New South Wales, Australia		
RSH	PARS	Russian Mission Airport	Russian Mission, Alaska, United States		
RSI		Red Sea International Airport	Red Sea Project, Tabuk Province, Saudi Arabia		
RSJ		Rosario Seaplane Base (FAA: W49)	Orcas Island, Washington, United States		
RSK	WASC	Abresso Airport	Ransiki, Indonesia		
RSL	KRSL	Russell Municipal Airport	Russell, Kansas, United States		
RSN	KRSN	Ruston Regional Airport	Ruston, Louisiana, United States		
RSS	HSDZ	Damazin Airport	Ad-Damazin, Sudan		
RST	KRST	Rochester International Airport	Rochester, Minnesota, United States		
RSU	RKJY	Yeosu/Suncheon Airport	Yeosu / Suncheon, South Korea		
RSW	KRSW	Southwest Florida International Airport	Fort Myers, Florida, United States		
RSX		Rouses Point Seaplane Base (FAA: K21)	Rouses Point, New York, United States		
-RT-
RTA	NFNR	Rotuma Airport	Rotuma Island, Fiji		
RTB	MHRO	Juan Manuel Gálvez International Airport	Roatán, Honduras		
RTC	VARG	Ratnagiri Airport	Ratnagiri, Maharashtra, India		
RTG	WATG	Frans Sales Lega Airport	Ruteng, Indonesia		
RTI		David Constantijn Saudale Airport	Rote Island (Roti), Indonesia		
RTL		Spirit Lake Municipal Airport (FAA: 0F3)	Spirit Lake, Iowa, United States		
RTM	EHRD	Rotterdam The Hague Airport	Rotterdam, Netherlands		
RTN	KRTN	Raton Municipal Airport (Crews Field)	Raton, New Mexico, United States		
RTP	YRTP	Rutland Plains Airport	Rutland Plains, Queensland, Australia		
RTS	YRTI	Rottnest Island Airport	Rottnest Island, Western Australia, Australia		
RTW	UWSS	Saratov Tsentralny Airport	Saratov, Saratov Oblast, Russia		
RTY	YMYT	Merty Merty Airport	Merty Merty, South Australia, Australia		
-RU-
RUA	HUAR	Arua Airport	Arua, Uganda		
RUD	OIMJ	Shahroud Airport	Shahrud, Iran		
RUE		Butembo Airport	Butembo, Democratic Republic of the Congo		
RUF	WAJE	Yuruf Airport	Yuruf, Indonesia		
RUG	ZSRG	Rugao Air Base	Rugao, Jiangsu, China	UTC+08:00	
RUH	OERK	King Khalid International Airport	Riyadh, Saudi Arabia		
RUI	KSRR	Sierra Blanca Regional Airport (FAA: SRR)	Ruidoso, New Mexico, United States		
RUK	VNRK	Chaurjahari Airport	Rukumkot, Nepal		
RUL	VRQM	Maavarulu Airport	Gaafu Dhaalu Atoll, Maldives		
RUM	VNRT	Rumjatar Airport	Rumjatar, Nepal		
RUN	FMEE	Roland Garros Airport	St-Denis, Réunion, France		
RUP	VERU	Rupsi Airport	Rupsi, Assam, India		
RUR	NTAR	Rurutu Airport	Rurutu, French Polynesia		
RUS	AGGU	Marau Airport	Marau, Solomon Islands		
RUT	KRUT	Rutland – Southern Vermont Regional Airport	Rutland, Vermont, United States		
RUU		Ruti Airport	Kawbenaberi, Papua New Guinea		
RUV	MGRB	Rubelsanto Airport	Rubelsanto, Guatemala		
RUY	MHRU	Copán Ruinas Airport	Copán Ruinas, Honduras		
-RV-
RVA	FMSG	Farafangana Airport	Farafangana, Madagascar		
RVC		River Cess Airport	River Cess, Liberia		
RVD	SWLC	General Leite de Castro Airport	Rio Verde, Goiás, Brazil		
RVE	SKSA	Los Colonizadores Airport	Saravena, Colombia		
RVH	ULSS	Rzhevka Airport	Saint Petersburg, Russia		
RVI	URRR	Rostov-on-Don Airport	Rostov-on-Don, Rostov Oblast, Russia		
RVK	ENRM	Rørvik Airport, Ryum	Rørvik, Norway		
RVN	EFRO	Rovaniemi Airport	Rovaniemi, Finland		
RVO	FARI	Reivilo Airport	Reivilo, South Africa		
RVR		Green River Municipal Airport (FAA: U34)	Green River, Utah, United States		
RVS	KRVS	Richard Lloyd Jones Jr. Airport	Tulsa, Oklahoma, United States		
RVT	YNRV	Ravensthorpe Airport	Ravensthorpe, Western Australia, Australia		
RVV	NTAV	Raivavae Airport	Raivavae, Austral Islands, French Polynesia		
RVY	SURV	Pres. Gral. Óscar D. Gestido International Airport	Rivera, Uruguay		
-RW-
RWF	KRWF	Redwood Falls Municipal Airport	Redwood Falls, Minnesota, United States		
RWI	KRWI	Rocky Mount–Wilson Regional Airport	Rocky Mount, North Carolina, United States		
RWL	KRWL	Rawlins Municipal Airport (Harvey Field)	Rawlins, Wyoming, United States		
RWN	UKLR	Rivne International Airport	Rivne, Ukraine		
-RX-
RXA		Ar Rawdah Airport	Ar Rawdah (Raudha), Yemen		
RXE	KRXE	Rexburg–Madison County Airport	Rexburg, Idaho, United States		
RXS	RPVR	Roxas Airport	Roxas, Philippines		
-RY-
RYB	UUBK	Staroselye Airport	Rybinsk, Yaroslavl Oblast, Russia		
RYG	ENRY	Moss Airport, Rygge / Rygge Air Station	Oslo / Moss, Norway		
RYK	OPRK	Shaikh Zayed International Airport	Rahim Yar Khan, Pakistan		
RYL		Royal Airstrip	Lower Zambezi National Park, Zambia		
RYN	LFCY	Royan – Médis Aerodrome	Royan, Poitou-Charentes, France		
RYO	SAWT	Rio Turbio Airport	Río Turbio, Santa Cruz, Argentina		
-RZ-
RZA	SAWU	Santa Cruz Airport	Puerto Santa Cruz, Santa Cruz, Argentina		
RZE	EPRZ	Rzeszów–Jasionka Airport	Rzeszów, Poland		
RZN	UUWR	Turlatovo Airport	Ryazan, Ryazan Oblast, Russia		
RZP	RPSD	Cesar Lim Rodriguez Airport	Taytay, Philippines		
RZR	OINR	Ramsar International Airport	Ramsar, Iran		
RZS	OPSW	Sawan Airport	Sawan, Pakistan		
RZV	LTFO	Rize–Artvin Airport	Rize Province, Turkey		
RZZ	KRZZ	Halifax County Airport	Roanoke Rapids, North Carolina, United States		

== Notes ==
- ^1 REK is common IATA code for Keflavík International Airport (IATA: KEF) and Reykjavík Airport (IATA: RKV).
- ^2 RIO is common IATA code for Rio de Janeiro–Galeão International Airport (IATA: GIG), Santos Dumont Airport (IATA: SDU), Jacarepaguá Airport (IATA: RRJ) and Santa Cruz Air Force Base (IATA: SNZ).
- ^3 ROM is common IATA code for Leonardo da Vinci–Fiumicino Airport (IATA: FCO) and Ciampino–G. B. Pastine International Airport (IATA: CIA).
