= Alaska Airlines fleet =

Airline fleet

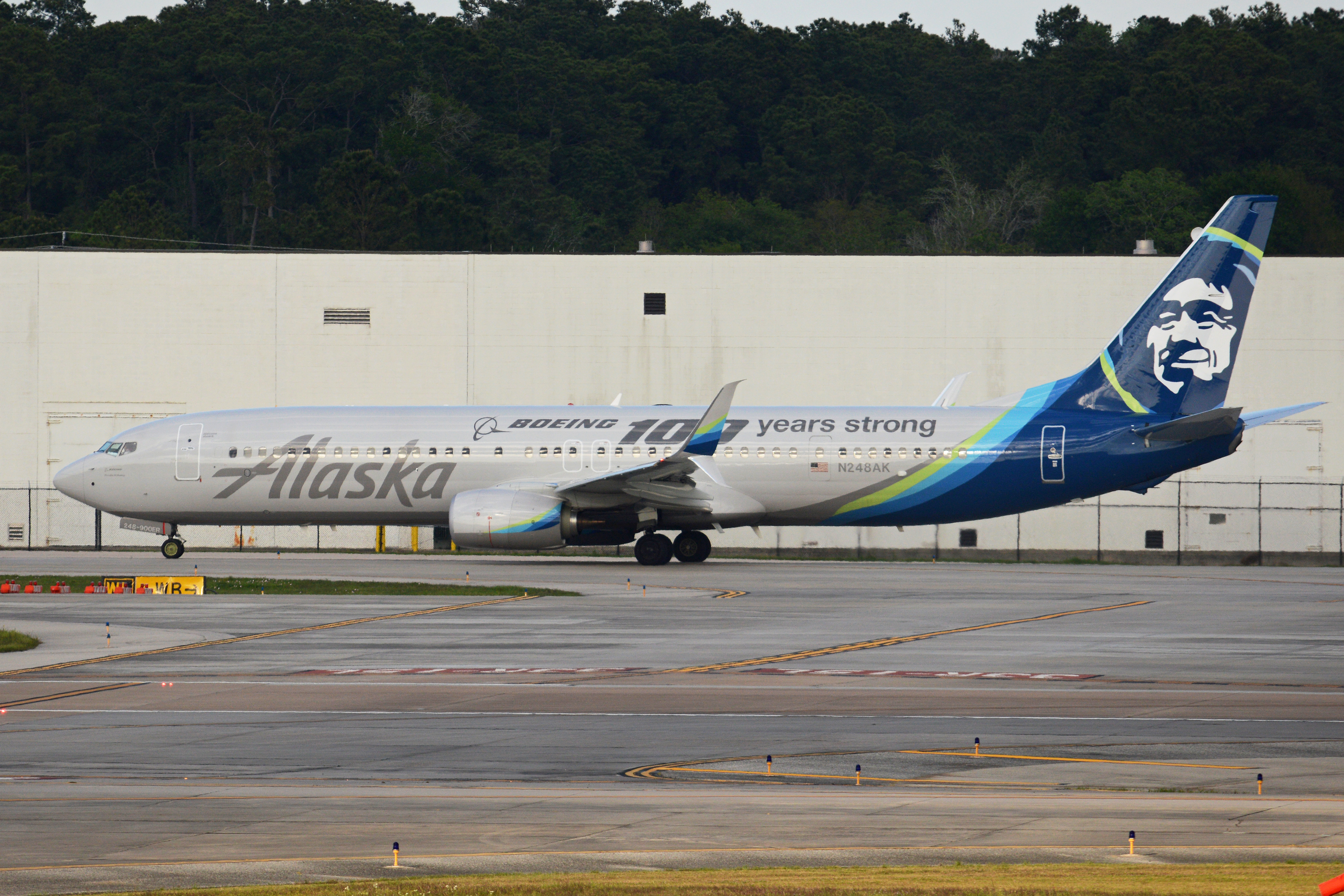
Alaska Airlines commemorated its relationship with Boeing in 2016, with a livery on a 737-900ER aircraft celebrating the plane maker's 100th anniversary.

As of June 2026, the Alaska Airlines fleet consists of 351 aircraft. The fleet includes Boeing 737 and Boeing 787 mainline passenger aircraft, Boeing 737 freighter aircraft, and a regional fleet of Alaska-branded Embraer 175 jets operated by the wholly owned subsidiary Horizon Air and third-party contractor SkyWest Airlines.

Alaska Airlines advertises its relationship with Boeing Commercial Airplanes. All aircraft in the mainline fleet have the Boeing logo and "Proudly Boeing" under the cockpit windows. Alaska operates an aircraft in a special livery celebrating the plane manufacturer's centennial.

== Current fleet ==
As of June 2026, Alaska Airlines operates an all-Boeing mainline fleet composed of the following jet aircraft:

Alaska Airlines fleet
Aircraft	In service	Orders	Passengers						Notes
Aircraft	In service	Orders	J	W/F	Y+	Y	Total	Refs	Notes
Mainline passenger fleet
Boeing 737-700	11	—	—	12	22	90	124		
Boeing 737-800	59	—	—	16	36	115	167		Some to be transferred to Hawaiian Airlines.
Boeing 737-900ER	79	—	—	16	42	120	178		
Boeing 737 MAX 8	4	—	—	12	30	117	159		Being reconfigured with more first class seats; to be completed by summer 2026.
Boeing 737 MAX 8	16	5	—	16	36	115	167		
Boeing 737 MAX 9	80	—	—	16	42	120	178		
Boeing 737 MAX 10	—	168	TBA				190		Deliveries from 2027.
Boeing 737 MAX 10	—	168	12	12	48	87	159		Deliveries from 2028.
Boeing 787-9	5	7	34	—	79	187	300		Deliveries through 2027. Four aircraft transferred from Hawaiian Airlines.
Boeing 787-9	—	—	34	35	58	152	279		New configuration with Aurora Suites starting 2028.
Boeing 787-10	—	5	40	35	49	194	318		Deliveries from 2028.
Regional passenger fleet
Embraer 175	49	1	—	12	16	48	76		Operated by Horizon Air.
Embraer 175	43	—	—	12	16	48	76		Operated by SkyWest Airlines.
Cargo fleet
Boeing 737-700BCF	3	—	Cargo						Converted to freighter from passenger.
Boeing 737-800BCF	2	4	Cargo						Converted to freighter from passenger. Deliveries begin 2027. Some to be used by Hawaiian Airlines.
Total	351	190							

=== Gallery ===
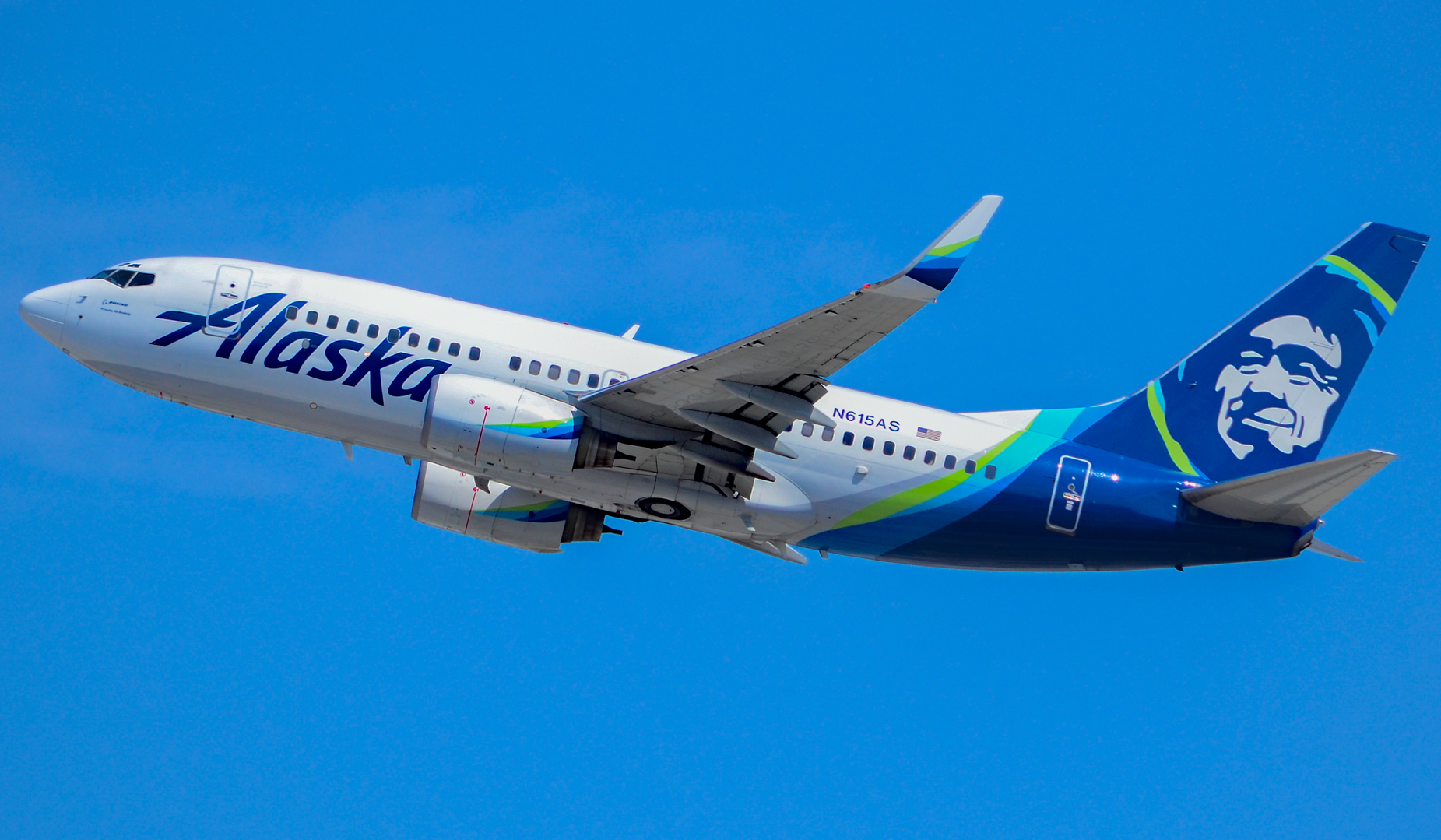
Boeing 737-700

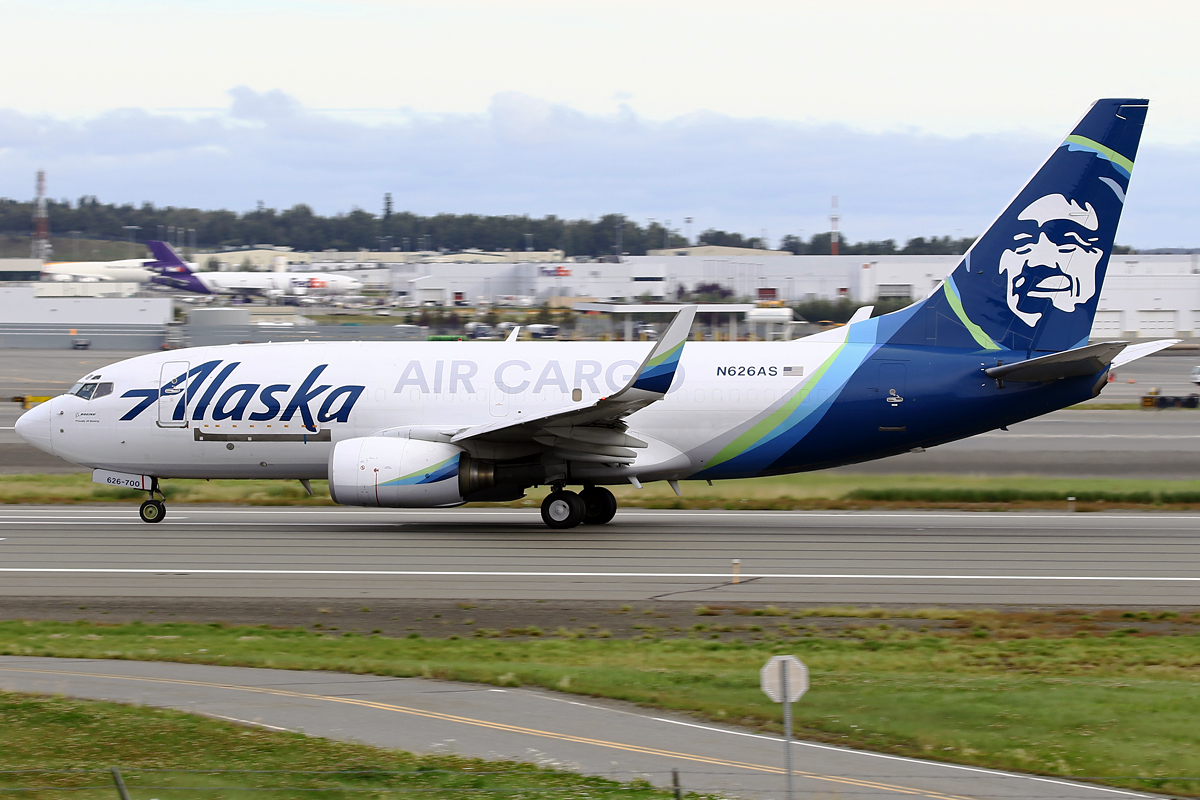
Boeing 737-700F

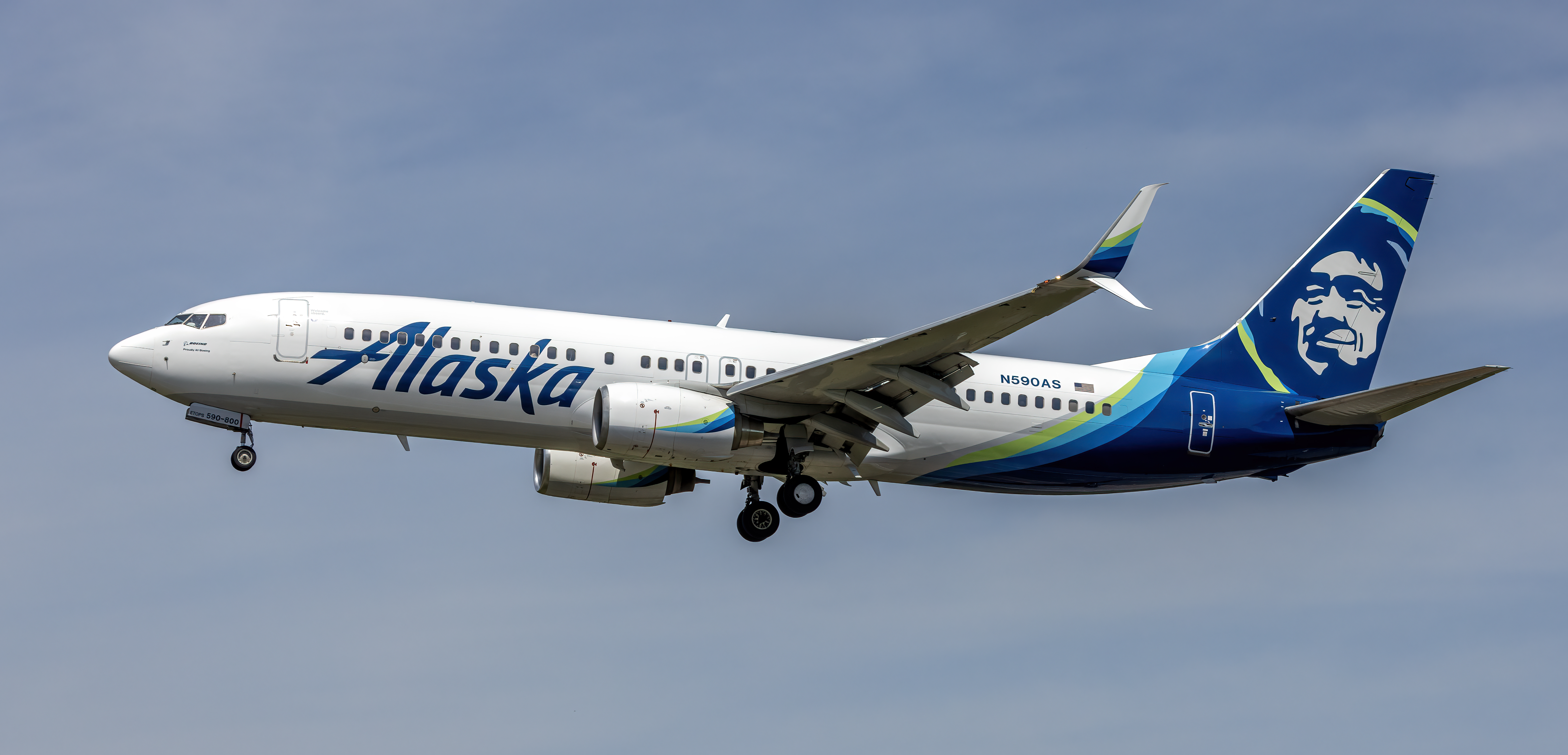
Boeing 737-800

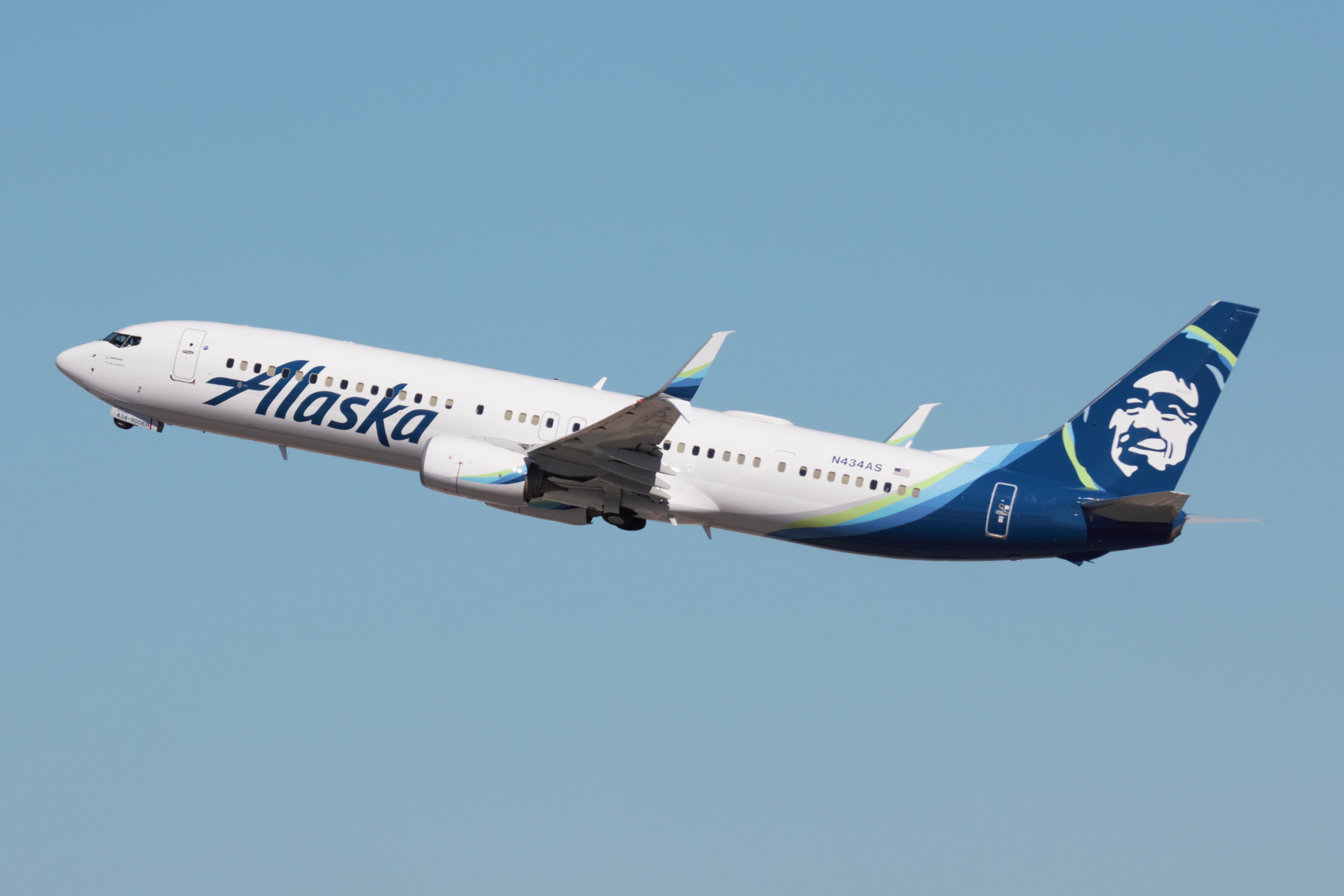
Boeing 737-900ER

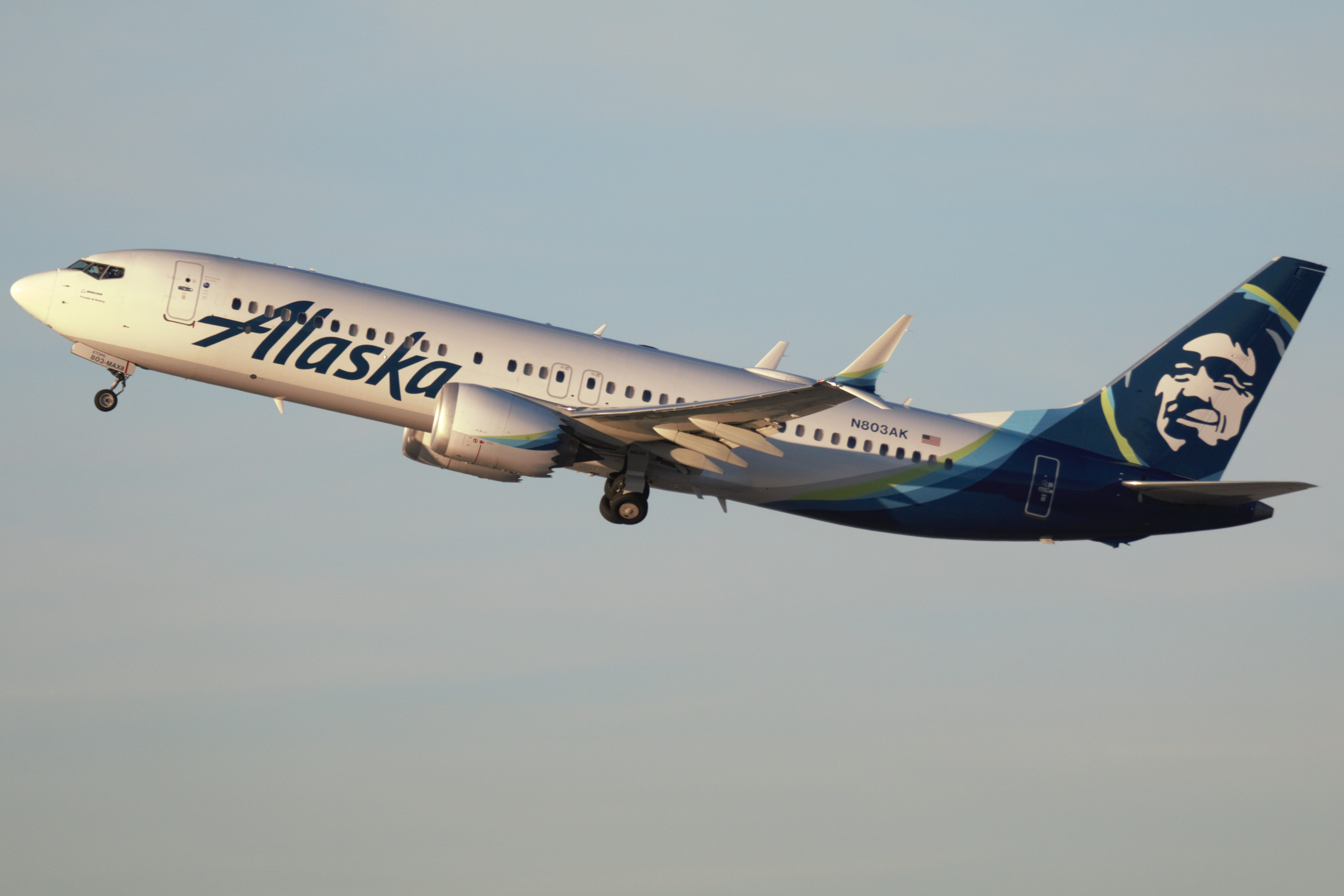
Boeing 737 MAX 8

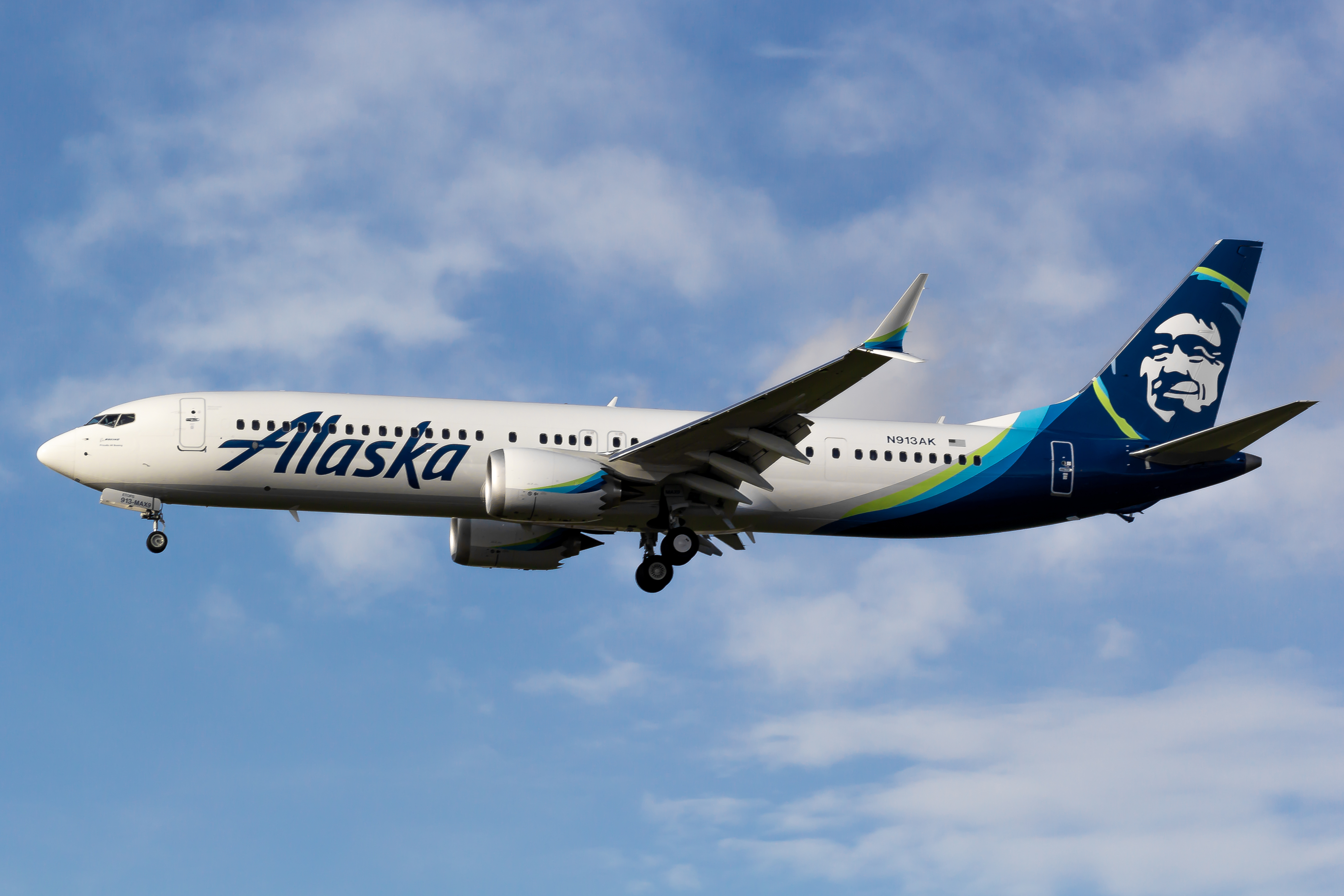
Boeing 737 MAX 9

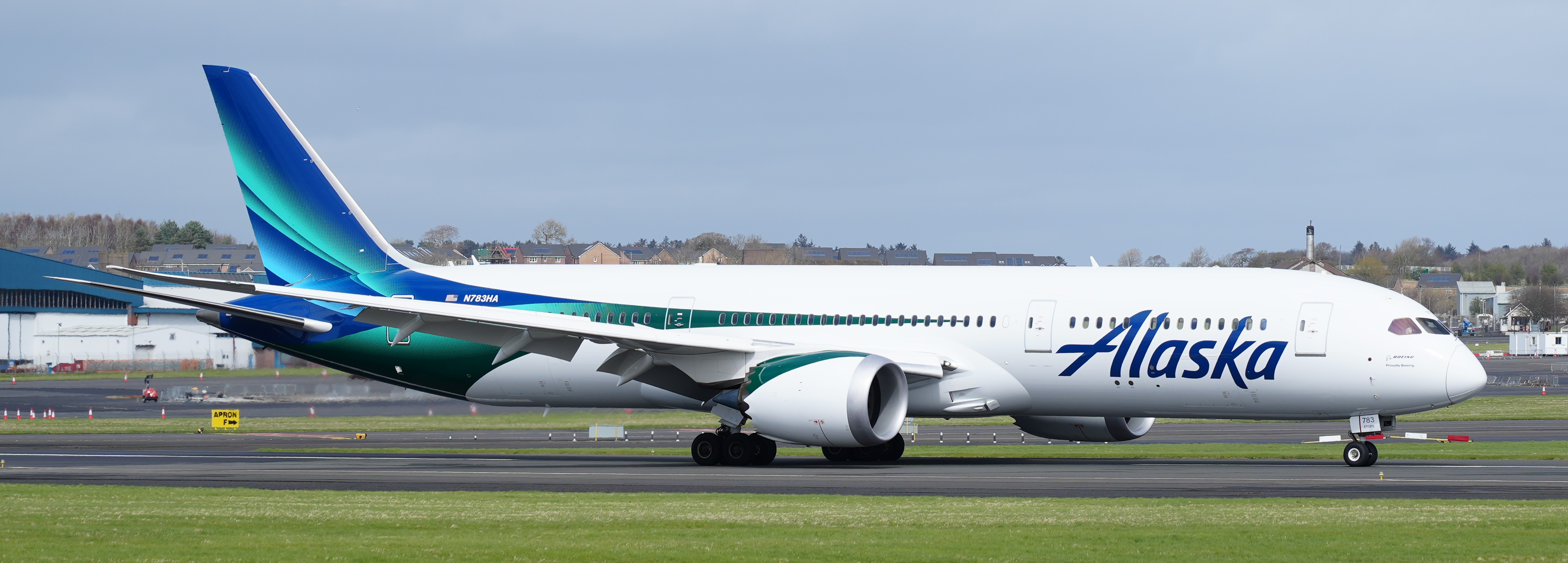
Boeing 787-9

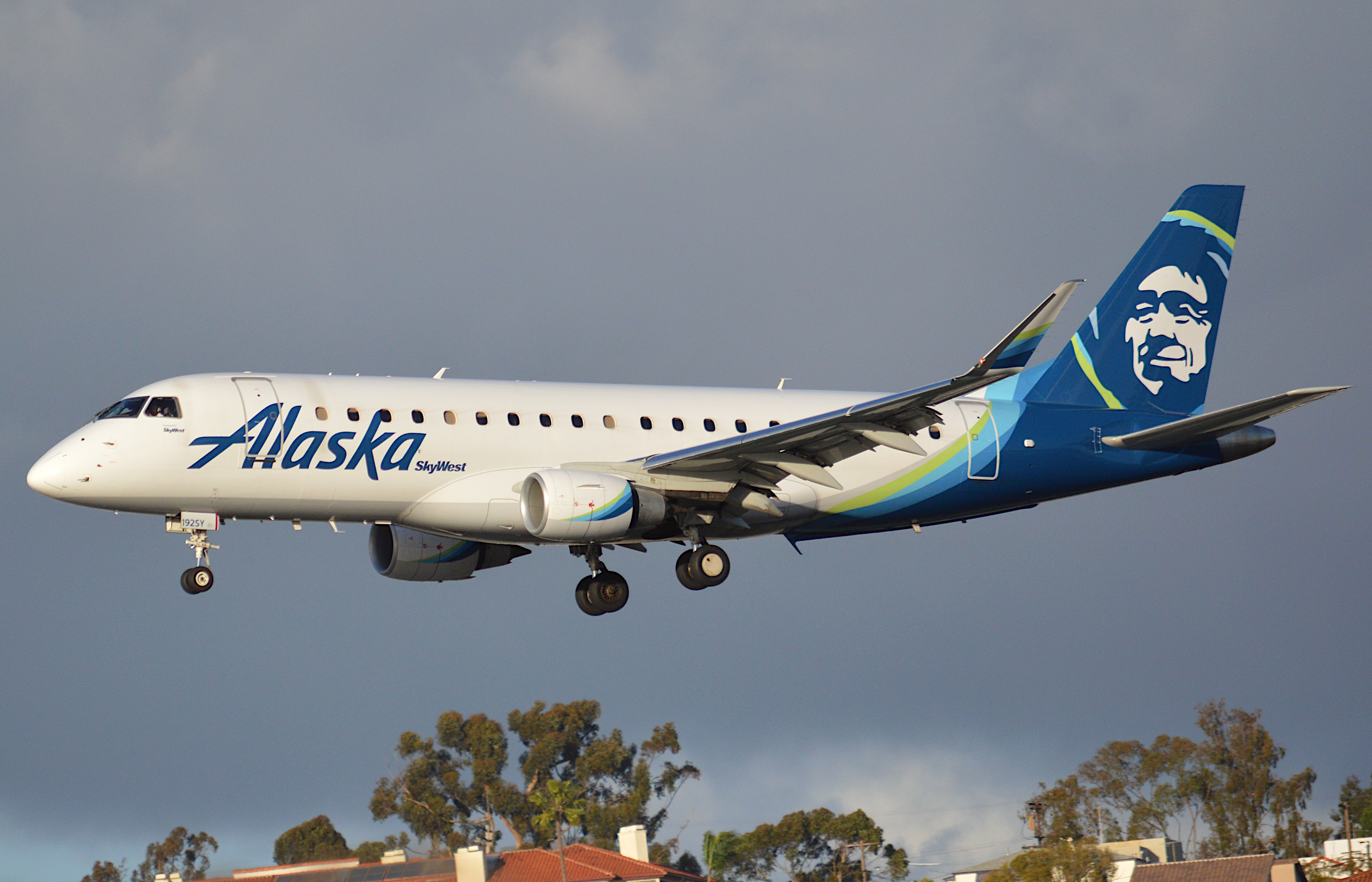
Embraer 175

== Fleet history ==
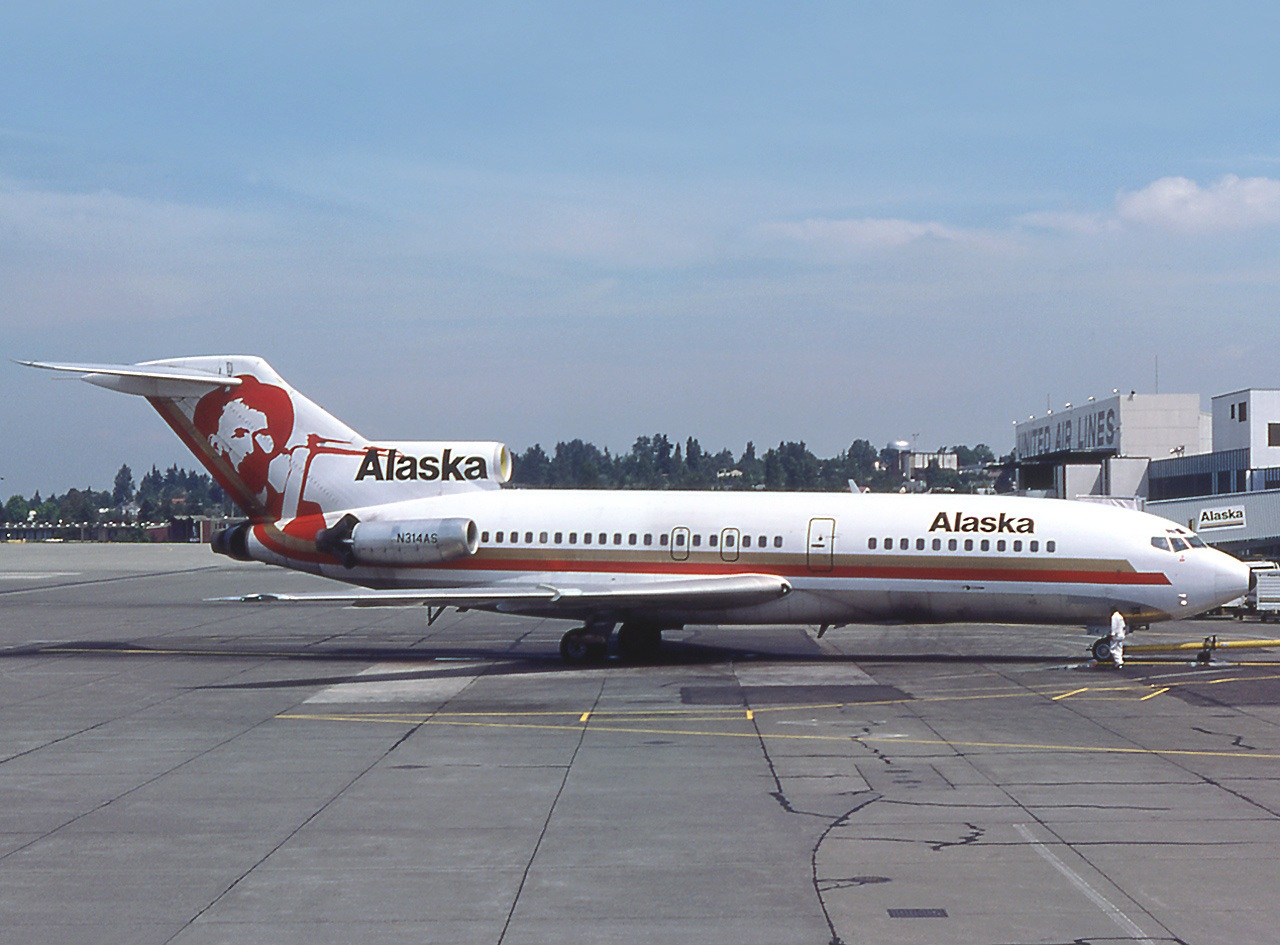
Alaska Airlines received its first Boeing 727-100 jet in 1966.

Since the 1960s, Alaska has consistently operated Boeing jet aircraft in its fleet. The first jetliner type operated by the airline was the Convair 880. Alaska also operated the Convair 990 jetliner. Besides the current Boeing 737 models flown by Alaska, the airline previously operated Boeing 707, Boeing 720 and Boeing 720B four-engine jets as well as the three-engine Boeing 727-100 and 727-200, and the twin-engine 737-200, 737-400 and Airbus A319 and A320. The last 727 was retired in May 1994.

=== Hercules ===
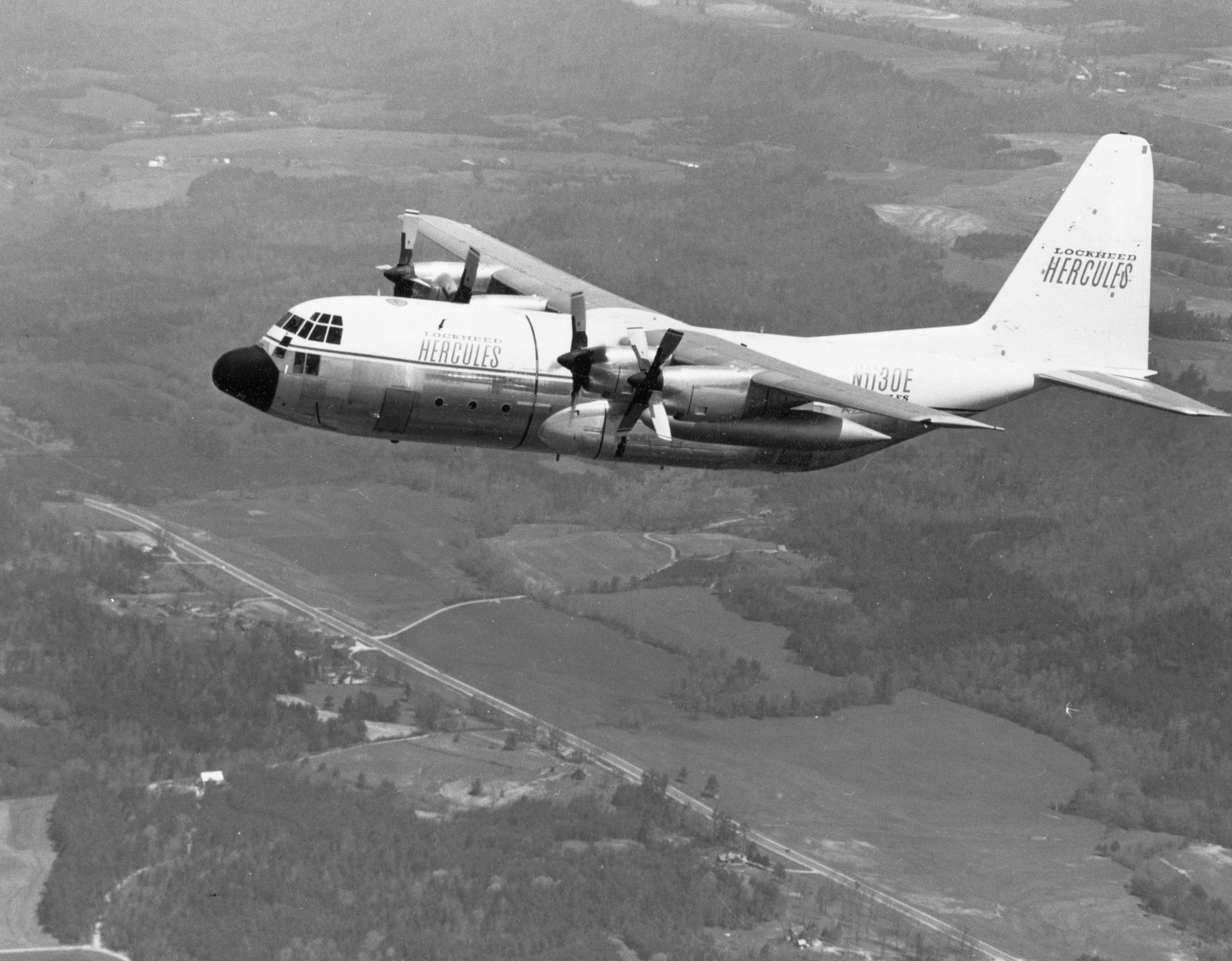
Lockheed L-100 Hercules prototype, which Alaska Airlines test flew in 1965

In 1965, Alaska Airlines tested the Lockheed L-100 Hercules prototype (civil version of the C-130 military transport) for a month, flying it, among other places, to Alaska's rugged North Slope (facing the Arctic Ocean), then a center of oil exploration, all of which relied on air transport. It proved to be the key aircraft for the task, able to land a full load on short gravel runways with easy unloading from its rear ramp. Alaska had two Hercules in its fleet by year-end 1966, growing to three in year-end 1968 (the year oil was discovered, which became the Prudhoe Bay Oil Field), and four by year-end 1970. But in 1970 expected construction of the Alaska pipeline was suddenly delayed by open-ended litigation by native Alaskan and environmentalists. Alaska's Hercules fleet dropped to one aircraft at year-end 1971, and in 1972 it suspended the program indefinitely.

=== MD-80 ===
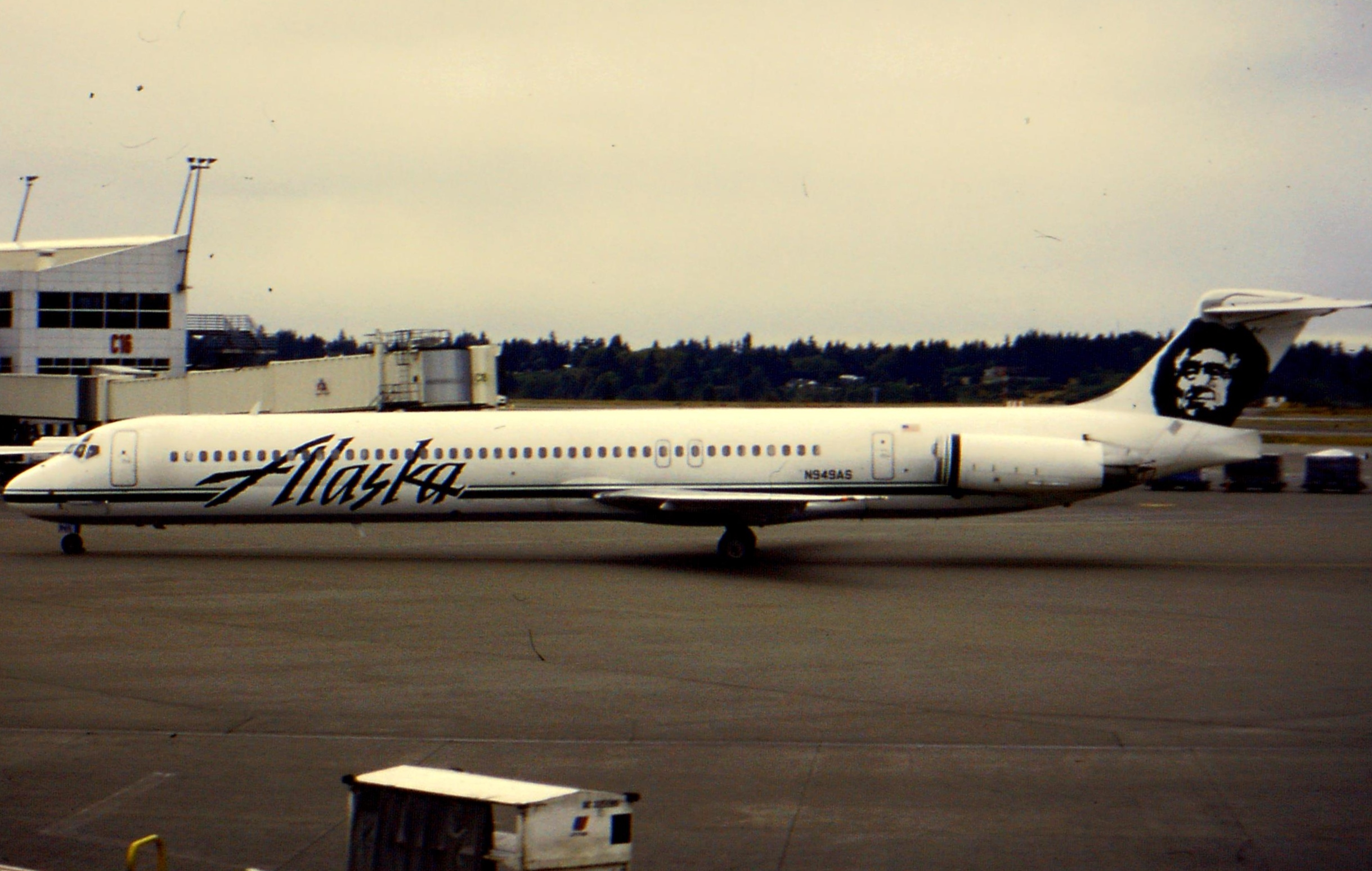
McDonnell Douglas MD-80 at Seattle–Tacoma in 1994

In the 1980s, Alaska began acquiring McDonnell Douglas MD-80s. Alaska acquired additional MD-80s via the acquisition of Jet America Airlines in 1987. Alaska was the launch customer for the MD-83 and took delivery of the first airplanes in 1985. Alaska continued to take delivery of new MD-83s in the 1990s, both to meet the demands of a growing route system and to retire its aging and fuel-inefficient 727 fleets. In 2005, due to the greater efficiency of the Boeing 737 Next Generation and rising costs for maintenance, fuel and crew training, Alaska Airlines decided to phase out the remaining 26 MD-80s and trained the pilots to fly the newer 737-800s that were being ordered to replace them. The last MD-80 flights took place in August 2008.

=== All-Boeing fleet ===
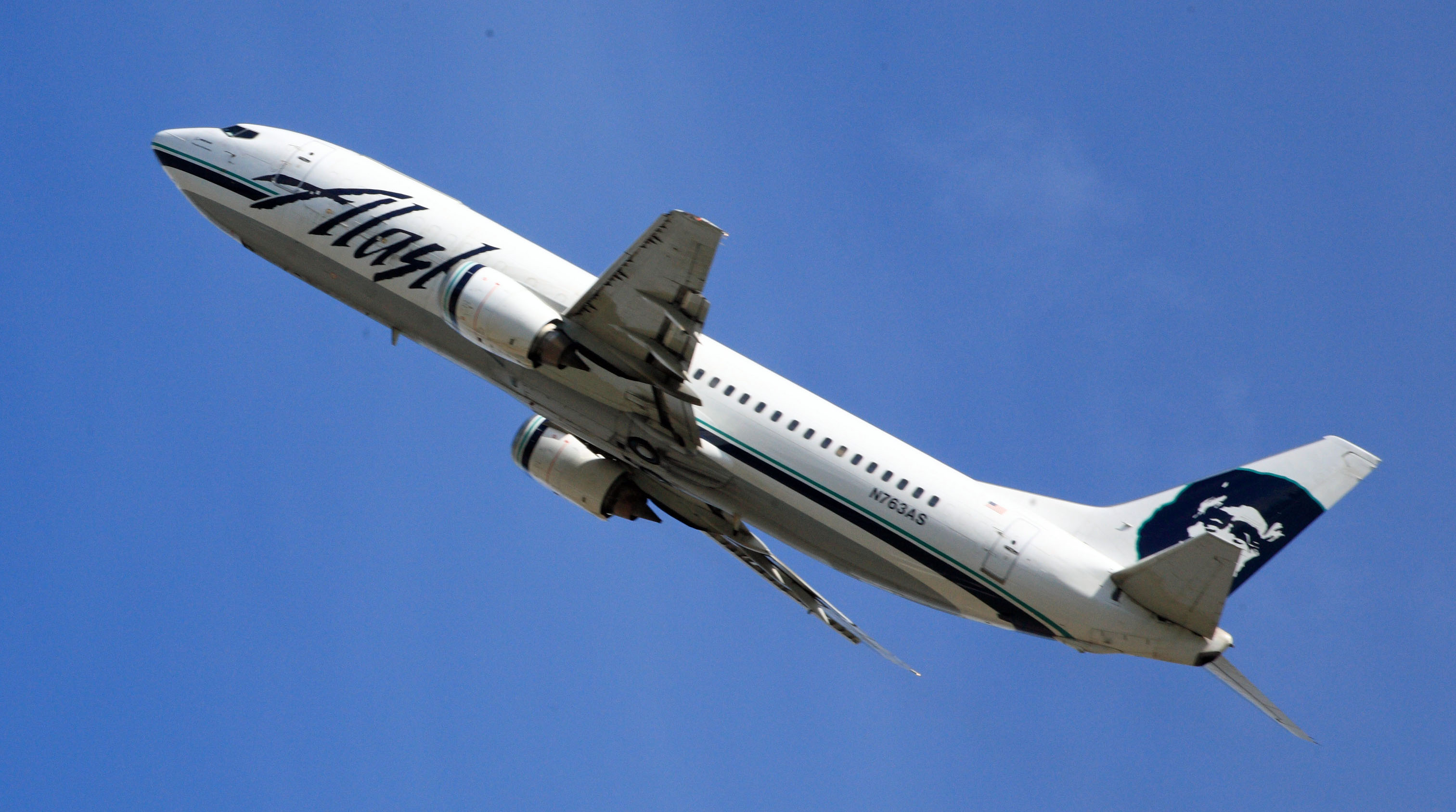
Between 1981 and 2017, Boeing 737 Combi aircraft played a large role in the airline's cargo deployment on routes to the state of Alaska.

Alaska used eight Boeing 737–200 Combi/QCs to suit the unique needs of flying milk runs in the state of Alaska. These combi aircraft operated with a mixed load of passengers and freight on the main deck. They were valued for their ability to be rapidly reconfigured, hence the moniker QC or "Quick Change", to match the cargo and passenger loads for any given flight. In the all-freight configuration, the 737-200 Combis carried up to six cargo containers, known as "igloos." The palletized floor allowed for passenger seating to range from 26 to 72 seats. The 737-200s were gravel-kitted, which allowed them to be used at airports such as Red Dog, which formerly featured a gravel runway. The last 737-200 Combi was retired in 2007 and is now displayed at the Alaska Aviation Museum.

Between 2006 and 2007, Alaska replaced the 737-200s with six reconfigured 737-400s. Five featured a mixed cargo/passenger Combi arrangement. One was a freighter carrying only cargo. Unlike the 737-200 Combi, the 737-400 Combis featured a fixed seating capacity of 72 seats. The 737-400 Combi aircraft were retired in October 2017. Alaska Airlines retired their passenger 737-400s in March 2018. At the time, it was the last major airline operating the 737 Classic.

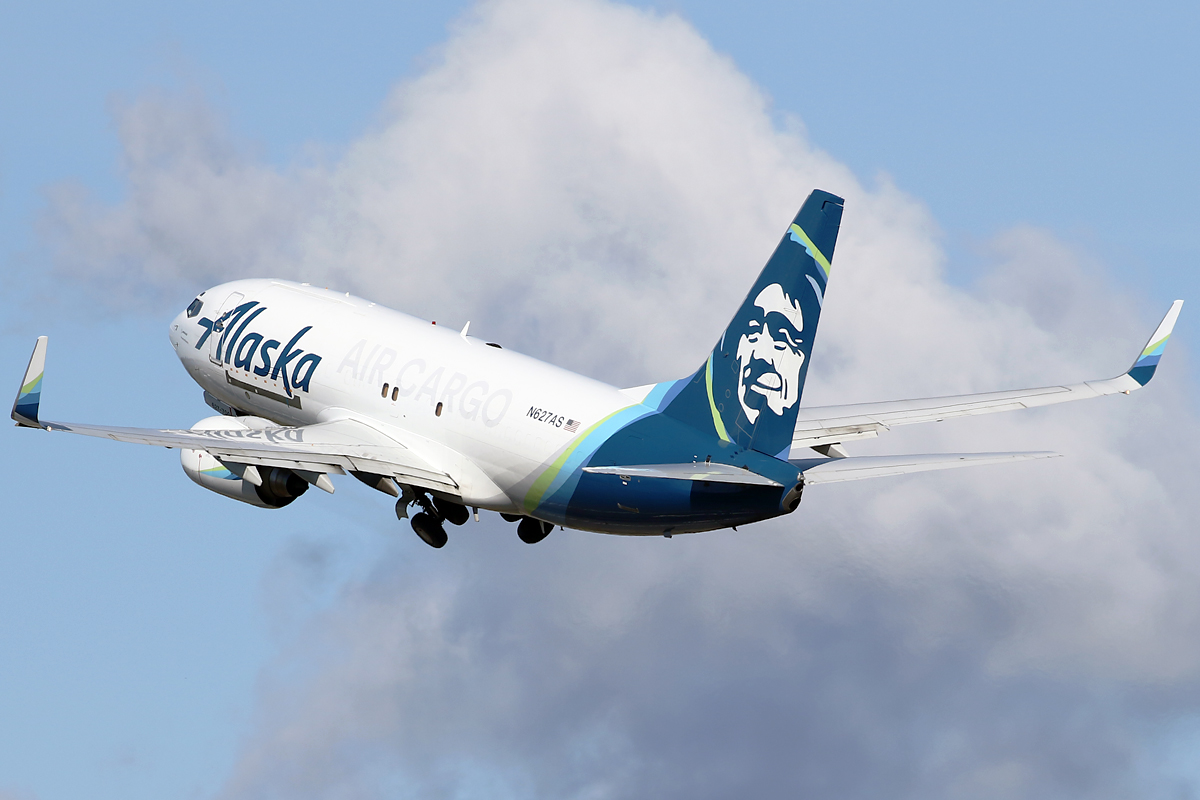
Alaska Air Cargo operates the 737-700F, one of two variants in its fleet.

The current cargo fleet consists of three Boeing 737-700 freighter jets, that were formerly passenger aircraft and converted to cargo aircraft in 2016 and 2017 by Israel Aerospace Industries. By the end of 2023, Alaska Air Cargo plans to add three 737-800 freighters to be converted by Boeing, from Alaska's existing fleet. Because the -800 can carry 40% more cargo than the -700, the aircraft will nearly double Alaska Air Cargo's available capacity.

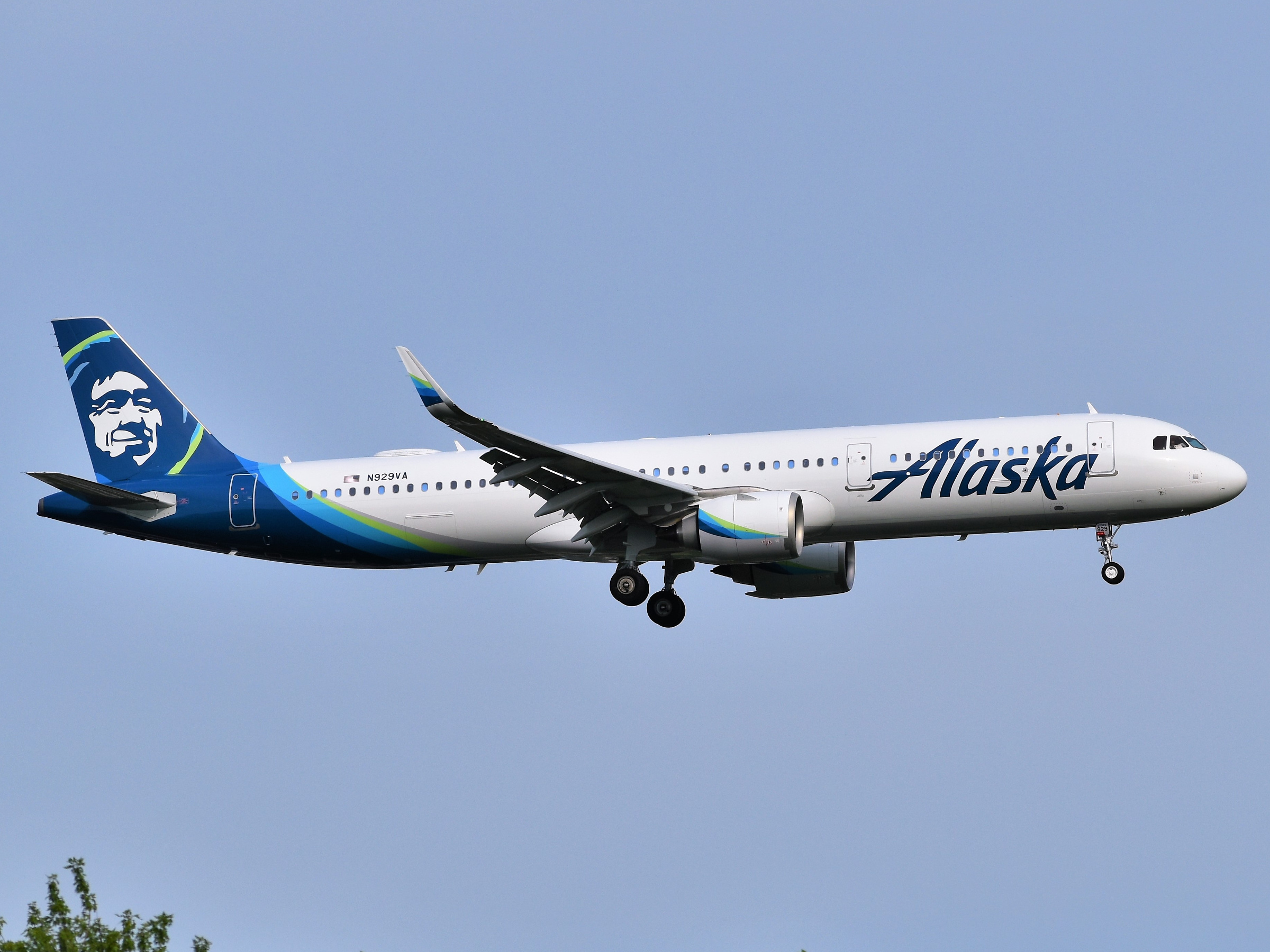
Airbus A321neo

After Alaska merged with Virgin America on January 11, 2018, it took possession of its fleet of Airbus aircraft. Over time, the airline slowly removed the Airbus jets from its fleet. All ten Airbus A319 jets were taken out of service in mid-2020 due to insufficient demand and low-profit margins due to the COVID-19 pandemic. The fleet of 53 A320 jets was slowly removed from service as leases expired and new 737s were purchased, with the final jet going out of service in January 2023. The airline's ten remaining Airbus A321neo jets are scheduled to be removed from service by the end of 2023, as part of their fleet simplification plan to revert to an all-Boeing fleet.

In January 2021, Alaska Airlines took delivery of its first 737 MAX 9, registered N913AK.

In January 2023, Alaska Horizon operated their last Bombardier Q400 flight.

In June 2024, Alaska began retirement of their Boeing 737-900 fleet, with the last retired in late 2025.

== Former fleet ==
Alaska Airlines formerly operated the following aircraft:

Aircraft:	Total	Introduced	Retired	Replacement	Notes
Airbus A319-100	10	2018	2020	Boeing 737 MAX	Former Virgin America fleet.
Airbus A320-200	53	2018	2023	Boeing 737 MAX	Former Virgin America fleet.
Airbus A321neo	10	2018	2023	Boeing 737 MAX	All sold to American Airlines.
Boeing 707	4	1970	1973	Boeing 727	Three leased at different times from Pan Am.
Boeing 720	4	1973	1975	Boeing 727	
Boeing 727-100	32	1966	1990	Boeing 737-400	N2969G crashed as Flight 1866. N124AS crashed as Flight 60.
Boeing 727-200	29	1970	1994	Boeing 737-400	
Boeing 737-200C	9	1981	2007	Boeing 737NG	
Boeing 737-400	40	1992	2018	Boeing 737NG	One converted into a freighter, and five into combis.
Boeing 737-900	12	2001	2025	Boeing 737-900ER; Boeing 737 MAX 9	Launch customer.
Bombardier CRJ700	9	2011	2018	Embraer 175	Operated by SkyWest Airlines.
Bombardier Dash 8 Q400	54	2011	2023	Embraer 175	Operated by Horizon Air.
McDonnell Douglas MD-82	14	1985	2007	Boeing 737NG	
McDonnell Douglas MD-83	35	1985	2008	Boeing 737NG	N963AS crashed as Flight 261.

== Livery ==
The airline's livery and logo remained mostly unchanged from the 1970s to the 2010s, with the word Alaska on the front sides of the fuselage, with an image of a smiling Alaska Native man on the vertical stabilizer as a logo. The identity of the man depicted in the logo remains disputed; Chester Seveck, a reindeer herder from Kotzebue, and former airline employee and entertainer Oliver Amouak are both considered leading candidates.

The image of the Alaska Native man (originally referred to as an "Eskimo") first appeared in 1972 alongside three other images that each represented a part of Alaska's history: a totem pole, a gold miner, and Russian spires. The Eskimo is depicted wearing a traditional qulittuq (parka with ruff). In 1976, the airline adopted the Eskimo tail fleet-wide, with the design slightly changed to have the face smiling. A proposed redesign in 1988 to replace the man's image with a mountain was protested by Alaskans and members of the Alaska Legislature.

Between the 1970s and the 2010s, Alaska's aircraft were painted all white, except for the image on the tail, with dark blue and teal stripes running the length of the sides of the fuselage. Between 1976 and 1990, the stripes were placed above and below the windows, with a simple, small "Alaska" text at the front of the plane. In 1990, the stripes were moved to the "belt line" of the plane, and the word "Alaska" was depicted as a wordmark with the letters designed to look like icicles. Starting in February 2015, Alaska rolled out an updated or "refreshed" livery. The changes included a simplified wordmark, stripes in a lighter shade of blue and darker green, and a simplified Eskimo design on the tail, with no teal outline.

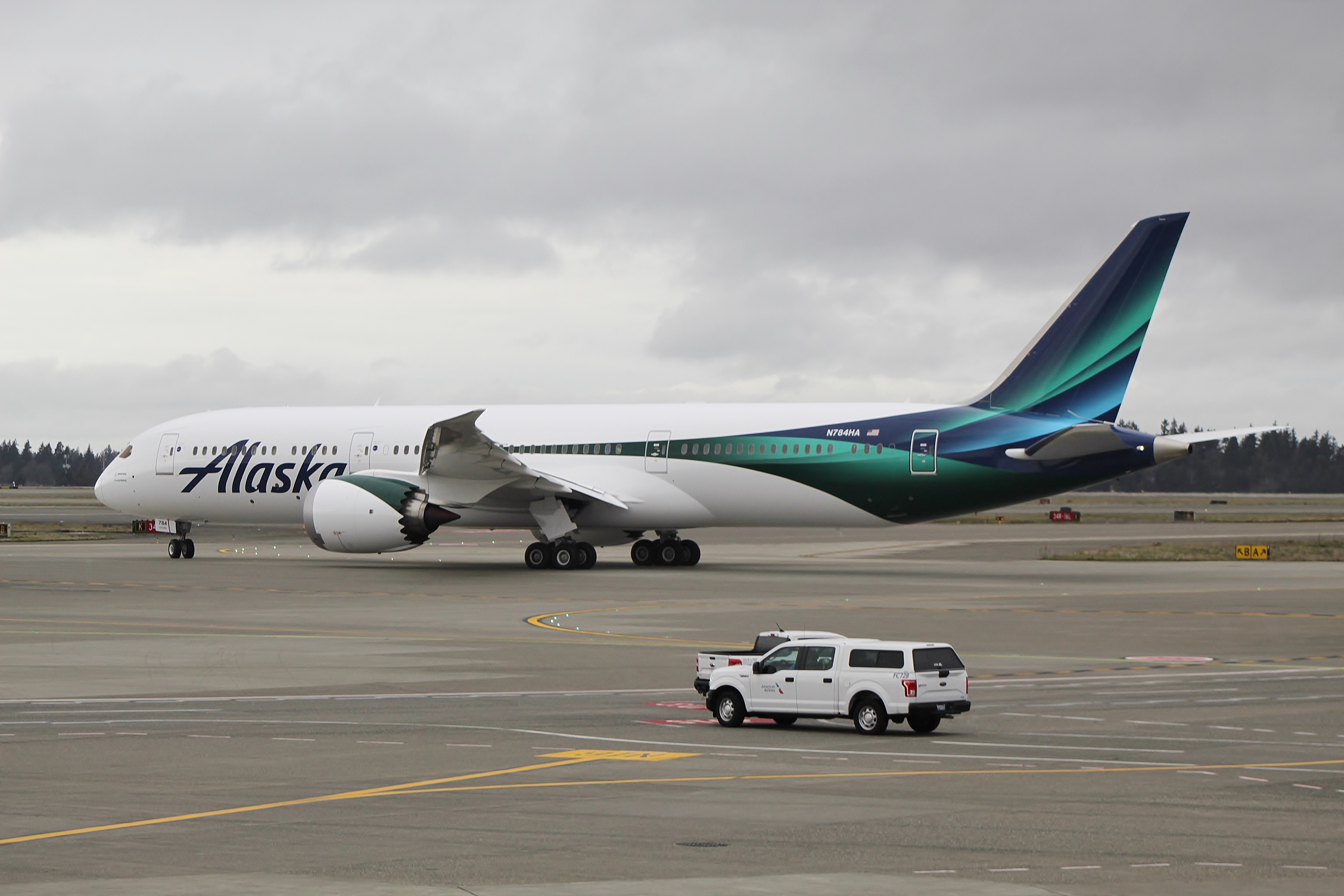
The first Boeing 787-9 operated by Alaska Airlines, painted in the "global" livery

In January 2016, the livery and logo received a major redesign. The Alaska wordmark was further streamlined and the design of the Eskimo logo was simplified and the ruffs on the parka were made more colorful. On the fuselage of planes, the stripes were eliminated and replaced by a "jelly bean" design with waves of dark blue, navy blue, teal, and green running up the side of the plane to the vertical stabilizer. A separate "global livery" solely for the airline's widebody fleet was announced in 2025 and debuted on its Boeing 787s in 2026. It replaces the smiling Alaska Native man on the vertical stabilizer with an array of blue and green colors that resemble the Aurora Borealis.
