= Red Dog Mine =

Red Dog Mine can refer to either of two places in the U.S. state of Alaska:

- Red Dog mine, a mine in the northwestern part of the state
- Red Dog Mine, Alaska, the census-designated place that includes the mine
