= Rille (disambiguation) =

A rille is a groove-like depression in the lunar surface.

Rille may also refer to:

- Risle, river in Normandy also spelt Rille
- Rillé, village and commune in Indre-et-Loire
- Rille (grape), a variety of grape also known as Arilla

== See also ==
- Rill, a narrow and shallow incision into soil resulting from erosion by overland flow
