= RIL =

RIL may refer to:

- Radio Interface Layer, a software interface used in a mobile device to communicate via mobile networks
- RDF Inference Language, a means of expressing expert systems rules and queries that operate on RDF models
- Reliance Industries Limited, a corporation in India
- Rice Lane railway station, England; National Rail station code RIL
- Recombinant Inbred Lines, a population derived from multiply inbred strains in order to study complex genetic traits which normally have large variation for a specific trait/traits
- The FAA and IATA identifier for Garfield County Regional Airport in Rifle, Colorado
- Randesund IL
- Russian Imperial Legion or Russian Imperial League
- 5th Royal Irish Lancers, British cavalry regiment

== See also ==
- Rill
