= Qarn Alam Airport =

Qarn Alam Airport Ghaba Qarn Alam
- IATA: RNM; ICAO: OOGB

Summary
- Airport type: Public
- Owner/Operator: Oman airports and PDO
- Serves: Qarn Al Alam
- Location: Adam
- Elevation AMSL: 443 ft / 135 m
- Coordinates: 21°22′40″N 57°03′20″E

Map
- Location of the airport in Oman RNM (Middle East) RNM (West and Central Asia) RNM (Asia)

Runways
Direction	Length		Surface
Direction	m	ft	Surface
12/30	2,564	8,412	Asphalt
- Source: Google Maps SkyVector

Qarn Alam (IATA: RNM, ICAO: OOGB) is an airport serving the town of Qarn Alam in Oman. The airport is 9 kilometres (5.6 mi) northwest of the town.

The Ghaba non-directional beacon (Ident: OL) is 5.3 nautical miles (9.8 km) south of the runway.

== See also ==
- Transport in Oman
- List of airports in Oman
