= Marsabit Airport =

- IATA: RBT; ICAO: HKMB

Summary
- Airport type: Public, Civilian
- Owner: Kenya Airports Authority
- Serves: Marsabit, Kenya
- Location: Marsabit, Kenya
- Elevation AMSL: 4,390 ft / 1,338 m
- Coordinates: 02°20′42″N 38°00′00″E

Map
- Location of Marsabit Airport in Kenya; Placement on map is approximate

Runways
| Direction | Length | | Surface |
| Direction | ft | m | Surface |
|---|---|---|---|
| 13/31 | 3,623 | 1,104 | Asphalt |

Marsabit Airport is an airport in Marsabit, Kenya.

== Location ==
Marsabit Airport (IATA: RBT, ICAO: HKMB) is located in, Marsabit County, in the town of Marsabit, in the northern Kenyan desert, near the International border with Ethiopia.

Its location is approximately 420 kilometres (260 mi), by air, north of Nairobi International Airport, the country's largest civilian airport. The geographic coordinates of this airport are:2° 20' 42.00"N, 38° 0' 0.00"E (Latitude:2.345000; Longitude:38.000000).

== Overview ==
Marsabit Airport is a small civilian airport, serving Marsabit and surrounding communities. Situated at 1,338 metres (4,390 ft) above sea level, the airport has a single asphalt runway that measures 1,104 metres (3,623 ft) long.

== See also ==
- Marsabit
- Mount Marsabit
- Eastern Province (Kenya)
- Kenya Airports Authority
- Kenya Civil Aviation Authority
