= Alaska Airlines Flight 60 =

1976 aviation accident

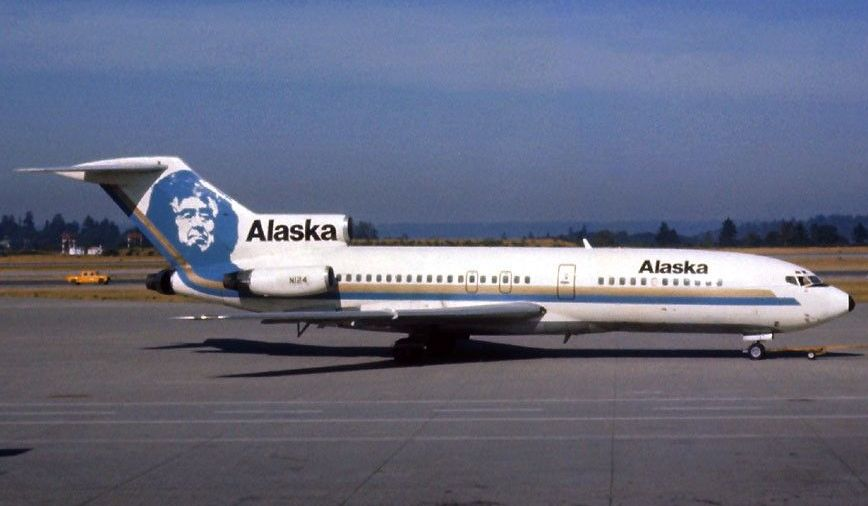
- The aircraft involved in the accident, pictured in 1974, in a previous registration

Accident
- Date: April 5, 1976
- Summary: Runway overrun, pilot error
- Site: Ketchikan International Airport, Ketchikan, Alaska, United States

Aircraft
- Aircraft type: Boeing 727-81
- Operator: Alaska Airlines
- Registration: N124AS
- Flight origin: Ted Stevens Anchorage International Airport, Anchorage, Alaska, United States
- 1st stopover: Juneau International Airport, AK (JNU/PAJN), Juneau, Alaska, United States
- Last stopover: Ketchikan International Airport, Ketchikan, Alaska, United States
- Destination: Seattle–Tacoma International Airport, Seattle, Washington, United States
- Occupants: 50
- Passengers: 43
- Crew: 7
- Fatalities: 1
- Injuries: 49 (32 serious and 17 minor)
- Survivors: 49

Alaska Airlines Flight 60 was an Alaska Airlines flight involving a Boeing 727-81 at Ketchikan International Airport in Ketchikan, Alaska, United States, which crashed during a failed go-around on April 5, 1976. One passenger was killed in the accident, with the other 49 occupants suffering injuries (32 serious and 17 minor).

== Crew ==
On its final journey, Flight 60 was under the command of 55-year-old captain Richard L. Burke, who had a total of 19,813 hours of flight experience, including 2,140 hours on the Boeing 727 and had been in service with Alaska Airlines since 1960, while 42-year-old co-pilot Richard Bishop had a total of 3,193 total flight hours of experience, including 1,980 hours on the Boeing 727 and had been in service with Alaska Airlines since 1966. 43-year-old Second officer Huston Leach was employed by Alaska Airlines in the same year as co-pilot Bishop, had accumulated 3,454 total flight hours, including 2,641 hours on the Boeing 727.

== Accident ==
Having originated in Anchorage, Alaska, Alaska Airlines Flight 60 took off from Juneau International Airport in Juneau, Alaska, at 7.38 am on April 5, 1976, on a scheduled flight to Seattle, Washington, with a final stopover at Ketchikan International Airport, Ketchikan, Alaska, carrying 7 crew and 43 passengers.

At 8.05 am, Anchorage air traffic control cleared Flight 60 for an approach to runway 11 at Ketchikan. At 8.11 am, Flight 60 started its descent from 10,000 feet (3,048 m) towards runway 11 for an ILS approach under low cloud ceilings and low visibility conditions due to light snow and fog. When the flight was approx. 17 miles (15 nmi; 27 km) from the runway and at a height of 4,000 feet (1,219 m), the pilots acquired visual contact with the ground and water, resulting in the captain's decision to abandon an ILS approach in favour of a visual approach. At an altitude of 1,000 ft (305 m) and a distance of about 2 miles (1.7 nmi; 3.2 km), visual contact was made with the approach lights of runway 11.

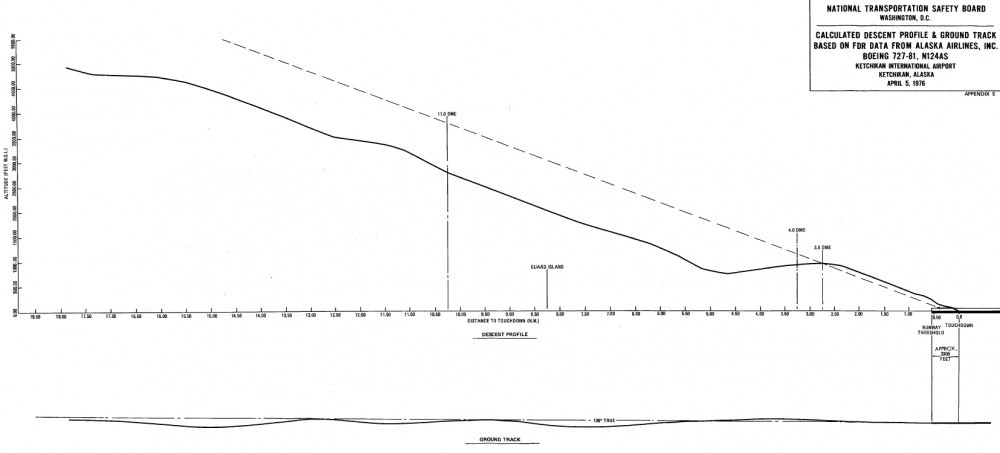
Alaska Airlines Flight 60 final route.

At 8.19 am, the flight touched down about 1,500 feet (500 yd; 457 m) beyond the runway threshold at a speed of 145 knots (167 mph; 269 km/h) alongside a tailwind of 3 knots (3.5 mph; 5.6 km/h). Upon landing, the captain reversed the engines and deployed the ground spoilers alongside the wheel brakes. However, the braking actions were poor due to the runway being wet at the time of landing. The captain thereby ordered a go-around and retracted the ground spoilers before setting the flaps to 25°, however the thrust reverser mechanism failed to fully disengage, meaning that the plane couldn't obtain full takeoff speed. Further attempts by the crew to disengage the reversers were equally unsuccessful, so the captain abandoned the go-around and deployed the ground spoilers again in another attempt to slow the aircraft down. Upon realising that the aircraft wasn't going to come to a halt before the end of the runway was reached, the captain turned the plane to the right and raised the nose. Shortly thereafter, the aircraft overran the runway and passed over a gully and a service road before striking the airport's antenna array support and crashing in a ravine some 700 feet (233 yd; 213 m) beyond the end of runway 11.

Following the crash, flight 60's fuselage was broken up in three pieces just before and beyond the wings, with the wing-section catching fire soon after the crash. Rescue personnel quickly arrived on the scene and almost all passengers and crew managed to evacuate the aircraft before it caught on fire. Firefighters were able to keep the fire at bay long enough for the pilots to be rescued from the cockpit about half an hour after the crash. All three pilots were seriously injured in the crash with captain Burke receiving multiple fractures to his legs and ribs, co-pilot Bishop suffering skull, rib, leg and spinal fractures and second officer Leach receiving multiple spinal fractures. Amongst the remaining crew, two were seriously injured while the remaining two received minor injuries. In the case of the passengers, 27 suffered from serious injuries and the remaining 15 received minor injuries, while 85-year-old Ruth Foster of Nyssa, Oregon was the only person to lose her life in the crash.

== Aircraft ==
The Boeing 727–81 involved, N124AS (msn 18821/124) conducted its first flight on March 4, 1965. Weeks later, the aircraft was delivered as JA8301 to All Nippon Airways. On May 31, 1972, the aircraft was returned to Boeing and was reregistered as N124 and later operated by Pacific Southwest Airlines before being leased to Alaska Airlines on June 22 of that same year. It was subsequently subleased to Mexicana on November 30, 1972, and reregistered as XA-SEB. The aircraft was returned to Alaska Airlines on January 10, 1974, and had its old registration as N124 reinstated. From December 14, 1975, until the time of the accident, the aircraft was registered as N124AS and in service of Alaska Airlines. At the time of the accident, the aircraft had a total of 25,360 total airframe hours.

== Aftermath ==
The aircraft was damaged beyond repair in the post-crash fire, while 49 out of its 50 occupants survived the accident with 32 them receiving various injuries. An investigation of the accident by the National Transportation Safety Board which lasted 261 days and was published on December 22, 1976, determined that captain Burke's faulty judgement to initiate a go-around after having committed to a full stop landing following an excessively long and fast approach and touchdown, was the main cause of the accident. The NTSB report also stated that the captain's unprofessional decision to abandon the precision approach contributed to the accident. Soon after the crash, captain Burke decided to retire from Alaska Airlines.
