= Qarn Alam =

Qarn Alam is a location in Oman, near Ghaba. It is known as the land of oil and gas. It is close to Mahout, Duqm, Masirah Island.

It is served by Qarn Alam Airport.

Coordinates: 21°18′56″N 57°05′55″E
