= Red Dog Mine, Alaska =

- Census-designated place
- Location in Northwest Arctic Borough and the state of Alaska.
- Coordinates: 68°4′19″N 162°52′34″W
- Country: United States
- State: Alaska
- Borough: Northwest Arctic

Government
  - Borough mayor: Dickie Moto
  - State senator: Donny Olson (D)
  - State rep.: Robyn Burke (D)

Area
  - Total: 68.85 sq mi (178.33 km^{2})
  - Land: 68.85 sq mi (178.33 km^{2})
  - Water: 0 sq mi (0.00 km^{2})
- Elevation: 850 ft (260 m)

Population (2020)
  - Total: 5
  - Density: 0.078/sq mi (0.03/km^{2})
- Time zone: UTC−9 (Alaska (AKST))
  - Summer (DST): UTC−8 (AKDT)
- Area code: 907
- FIPS code: 02-64980
- GNIS feature ID: 1865564
- Website: www.reddogalaska.com

Red Dog Mine is a census-designated place (CDP) in the Northwest Arctic Borough of the U.S. state of Alaska. The population was 5 at the 2020 census, down from 309 in 2010.

== Economy ==
The Red Dog mine is the only economic activity and the mine is the only inhabited site within the Red Dog Mine CDP.

== Mining ==
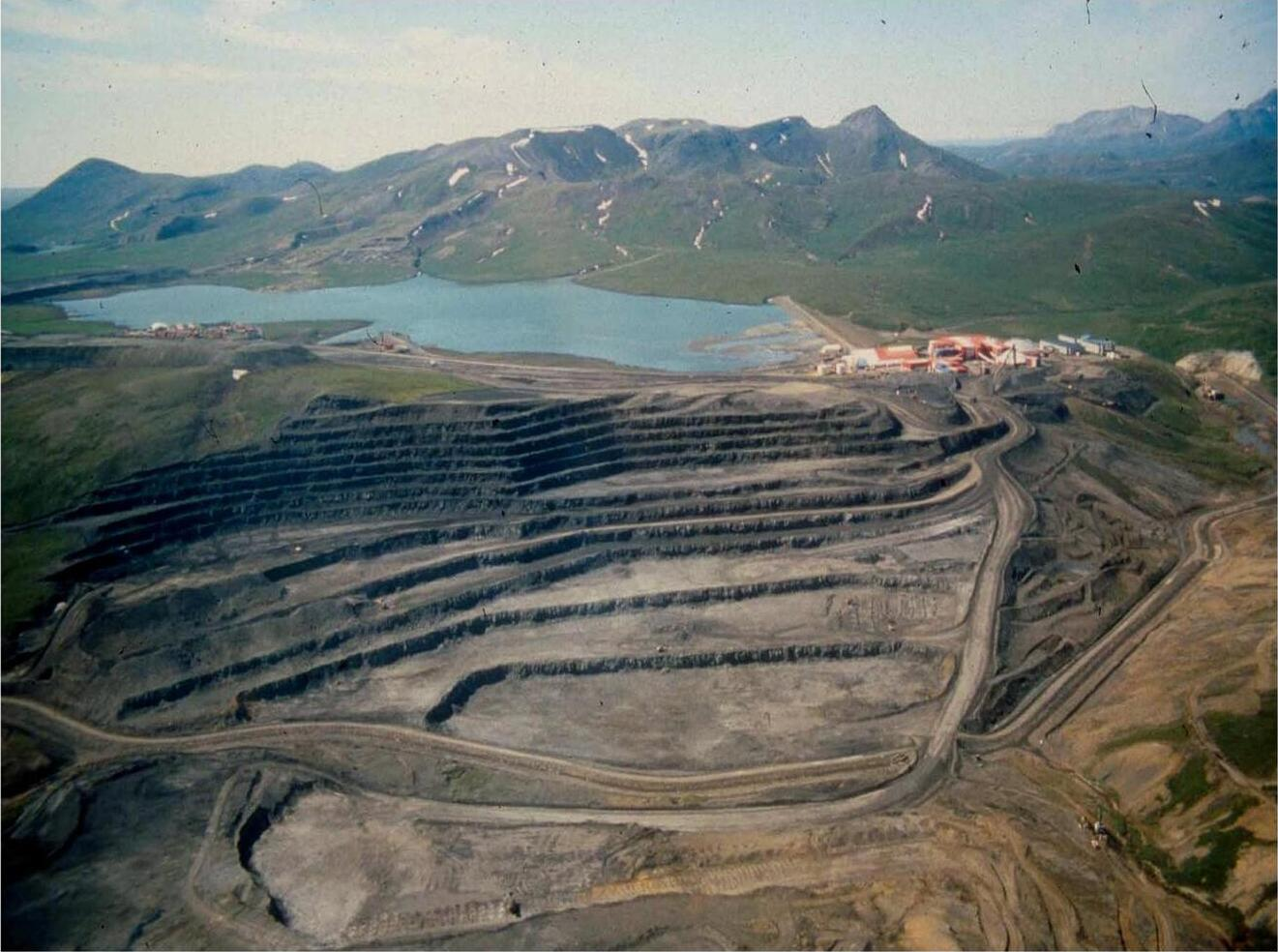
The Red Dog mine

The Red Dog Mine CDP derives its name from the Red Dog mine, the United States' largest source for zinc and a significant source of lead and germanium. Construction of the Red Dog mine began in 1987, after exploration revealed that the area was rich in metals.

The Red Dog ore body is one of the world's most significant zinc deposits, containing a number of ore bodies. The mine is located in Alaska's Northwest Arctic Borough, in the DeLong Mountains of the western Brooks Range, 90 miles north of Kotzebue and 55 miles from the Chukchi Sea.

At the end of 2007, the site's proven and probable reserves plus indicated resources amounted to 77.5 million tons, containing 17.5 percent zinc and 4.8 percent lead, as well as 2.8 ounces per ton of silver. In addition, Red Dog also contains 36.6 million tons of inferred resources. The entire deposit lies inside a relatively small area (one mile by one-half mile). The deposit is essentially flat-lying at the surface, making open pit mining the extraction method of choice.

== Geography ==
Red Dog Mine is located at 68°04′19″N 162°52′34″W. It is in the DeLong Mountains in the remote western Brooks Range about 90 miles (140 km) north of Kotzebue and 55 miles (89 km) from the Chukchi Sea.

Red Dog Mine is very isolated. It is located within the Northwest Arctic Borough, an area approximately the size of Indiana with only 11 communities, none connected by roads, with a total population of only 7,523 people at the 2010 census. The nearest of those communities are Noatak, population 514, roughly 50 miles (80 km) south and Kivalina, population 374, roughly 60 miles (100 km) west at the 2010 census.

Although native populations have historically used the nearby area for seasonal food-gathering, there are no permanent residents at the mine or the port site. The mine's workforce consists of about 460 employees and contractors, of which somewhat more than half will be on-site at any given time. At the mine, everyone stays in the single large housing unit, tucked in among the process buildings near the edge of the open pit, while a small portion of the work force stays at the port site.

According to the United States Census Bureau, the CDP has a total area of 66.9 square miles (173 km^{2}), all land.

=== Climate ===
The climate type of Red Dog Mine belongs to the subarctic climate (Köppen: Dwc), which is mainly characterized by cold and long winters and warm and short summers. June and July are the warmest months of the year and the only months with average temperatures above 50 °F (10 °C). In midsummer, daytime temperatures average around 61 °F (16 °C), while in winter, nighttime temperatures average around 0 °F (−18 °C). In summer, there are 13 days with highs of 70 °F (21 °C) each year; in winter, there are 76 days with lows below 0 °F (−18 °C). Temperature extremes ranged from −43 °F (−42 °C) on February 1, 2012, to 87 °F (31 °C) on June 19, 2013.

Climate data for Red Dog Mine, Alaska (2006–2020 normals, extremes 2010–present)
Month	Jan	Feb	Mar	Apr	May	Jun	Jul	Aug	Sep	Oct	Nov	Dec	Year
Record high °F (°C)	47 (8)	38 (3)	37 (3)	52 (11)	80 (27)	87 (31)	85 (29)	84 (29)	65 (18)	60 (16)	41 (5)	39 (4)	87 (31)
Mean daily maximum °F (°C)	11.7 (−11.3)	13.0 (−10.6)	13.3 (−10.4)	26.4 (−3.1)	44.8 (7.1)	61.0 (16.1)	61.4 (16.3)	55.7 (13.2)	45.6 (7.6)	31.5 (−0.3)	18.4 (−7.6)	11.7 (−11.3)	32.9 (0.5)
Daily mean °F (°C)	5.6 (−14.7)	6.2 (−14.3)	6.6 (−14.1)	19.8 (−6.8)	37.1 (2.8)	51.0 (10.6)	53.1 (11.7)	48.5 (9.2)	39.1 (3.9)	26.6 (−3.0)	13.1 (−10.5)	5.6 (−14.7)	26.0 (−3.3)
Mean daily minimum °F (°C)	−0.5 (−18.1)	−0.6 (−18.1)	−0.1 (−17.8)	13.2 (−10.4)	29.4 (−1.4)	40.9 (4.9)	44.8 (7.1)	41.2 (5.1)	32.6 (0.3)	21.7 (−5.7)	7.8 (−13.4)	−0.5 (−18.1)	19.2 (−7.1)
Record low °F (°C)	−41 (−41)	−43 (−42)	−30 (−34)	−26 (−32)	−1 (−18)	23 (−5)	28 (−2)	21 (−6)	13 (−11)	1 (−17)	−19 (−28)	−28 (−33)	−43 (−42)
Average precipitation inches (mm)	1.11 (28)	0.57 (14)	1.92 (49)	0.31 (7.9)	1.54 (39)	1.76 (45)	4.16 (106)	4.74 (120)	2.38 (60)	1.61 (41)	0.70 (18)	0.79 (20)	21.59 (548)
Source: NOAA

== Demographics ==
Historical population
Census	Pop.	Note	%±
2000	32		—
2010	309		865.6%
2020	5		−98.4%
U.S. Decennial Census

Red Dog Mine first appeared on the 2000 U.S. census as a census-designated place (CDP).

As of the census of 2000, there were 32 people, 0 households, and 0 families residing in the CDP. The population density was 0.5 inhabitants per square mile (0.19/km^{2}). There were 0 housing units. The racial makeup of the CDP was 31.25% White, 65.62% Native American, and 3.12% from two or more races.

In the CDP, the age distribution of the population shows 18.8% from 18 to 24, 62.5% from 25 to 44, and 18.8% from 45 to 64. The median age was 34 years. For every 100 females, there were 700.0 males. For every 100 females age 18 and over, there were 700.0 males.

The median income for both males and females in the CDP was $0. The per capita income for the CDP was $34,438. 37.9% of the population were living below the poverty line.

== Transportation ==
A 55-mile-long (89 km) haul road connects the mine pit to its seaport on the Chukchi Sea. Concentrated lead and zinc powder are trucked year-round from the mine to a storage area near the port, but vessels are only able to reach the pier about 100 days a year when the area is ice-free.

The rest of the year, the area is only accessible by air, served by the Red Dog Airport. Mine workers from remote villages in the region are ferried to the mine on small aircraft. Alaska Airlines is contracted by the mine to fly other mine workers out of Anchorage.
