= Red Dog Airport =

- IATA: RDB; ICAO: PADG; FAA LID: DGG

Summary
- Airport type: Private
- Owner: NANA
- Location: Red Dog Mine, Alaska
- Elevation AMSL: 969 ft / 295 m
- Coordinates: 68°01′56″N 162°53′57″W

Map
- Location of airport in Alaska

Runways
Direction	Length		Surface
Direction	ft	m	Surface
3/21	6,312	1,924	Asphalt

Statistics (2006)
- Enplanements: 8,475
- Source: Federal Aviation Administration

Red Dog Airport (IATA: RDB, ICAO: PADG, FAA LID: DGG) is a private-use airport located at Red Dog Mine, in the U.S. state of Alaska. The airport is privately owned by the NANA (Northwest Arctic Native Association) Regional Corporation. It has one asphalt paved runway designated 2/20 which measures 6,312 x 100 ft. (1,924 x 30 m). Red Dog Mine has chartered Alaska Airlines to carry mine workers to and from Anchorage from the airport.

As per Federal Aviation Administration records, this airport had 7,968 passenger boardings (enplanements) in calendar year 2005 and 8,475 enplanements (105 scheduled + 8,370 unscheduled) in 2006.

Although most U.S. airports use the same three-letter location identifier for the FAA and IATA, Red Dog Airport is assigned DGG by the FAA and RDB by the IATA. The airport's ICAO identifier was changed from PARD to PADG.

== See also ==
- List of airports in Alaska
