= Rill =

Shallow channel cut by water

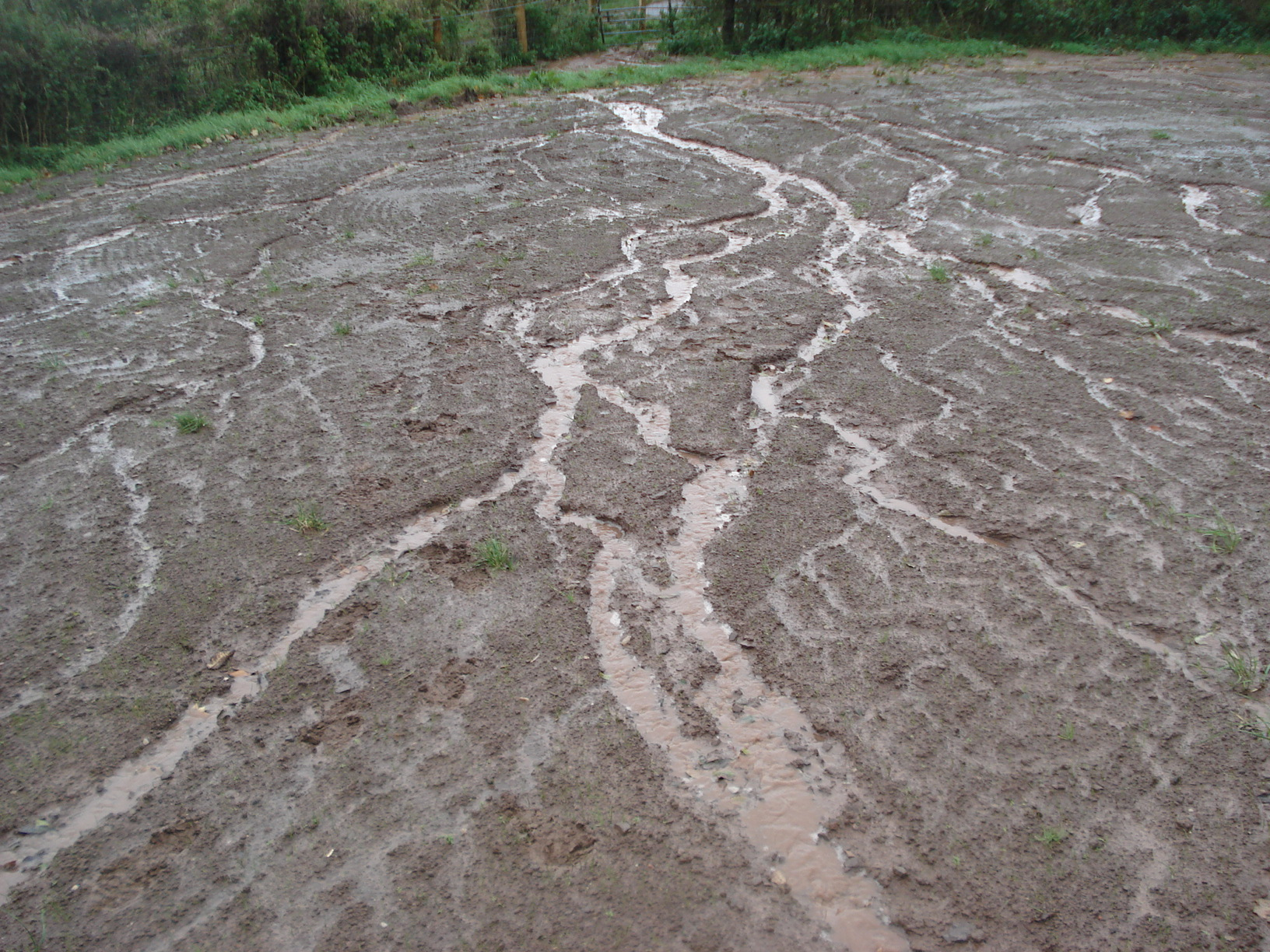
A downslope view of part of the eroding rill network from County Tyrone, Northern Ireland. See below for a close-up view of a single rill

In hillslope geomorphology, a rill is a shallow channel (no more than a few inches/centimeters deep) cut into soil by the erosive action of flowing surface water. Similar but smaller incised channels are known as microrills; larger incised channels are known as gullies.

Artificial rills are channels constructed to carry a water supply from a distant water source. In landscape or garden design, constructed rills are an aesthetic water feature.

== Rills created by erosion ==
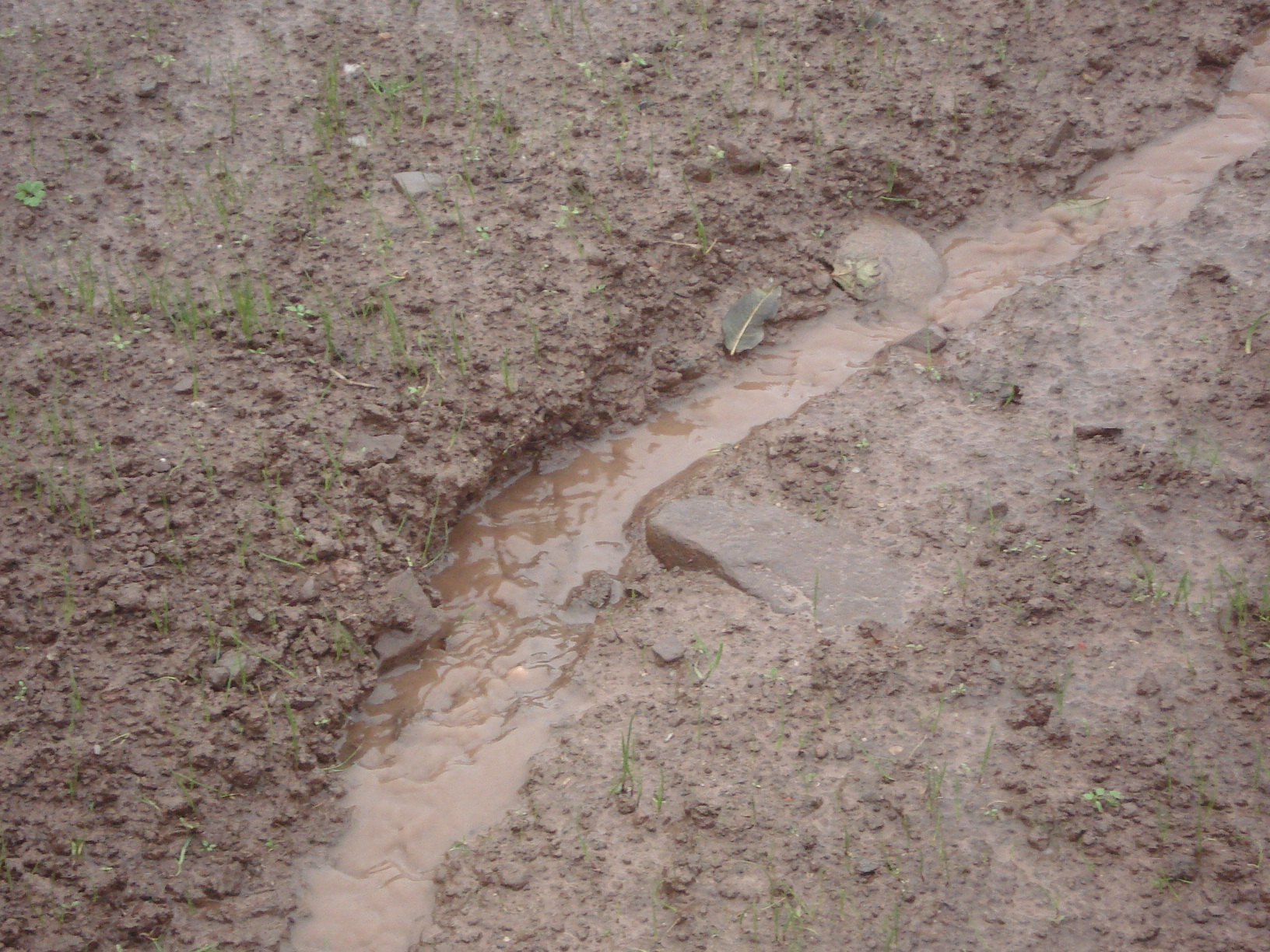
Water flowing in an actively-eroding rill on bare farmland in County Tyrone, Northern Ireland

Rills are narrow and shallow channels which are eroded into unprotected soil by hillslope runoff. Since soil is regularly left bare during agricultural operations, rills may form on farmland during these vulnerable periods. Rills may also form when bare soil is left exposed following deforestation, or during construction activities.

Rills are fairly easily visible when first incised, so they are often the first indication of an ongoing erosion problem. Unless soil conservation measures are put into place, rills on regularly eroding areas may eventually develop into larger erosional features such as gullies or even (in semi-arid regions) into badlands.

=== Rill initiation ===
Rills are created when water erodes the topsoil on hillsides and so are significantly affected by seasonal weather patterns. They tend to appear more often in rainier months. Rills begin to form when the runoff shear stress, the ability of surface runoff to detach soil particles, overcomes the soil's shear strength, the ability of soil to resist force working parallel to the soil's surface. This begins the erosion process as water breaks soil particles free and carries them down the slope. These forces explain why sandy, loamy soils are especially susceptible to the formation of rills, whereas dense clays tend to resist rill formation.

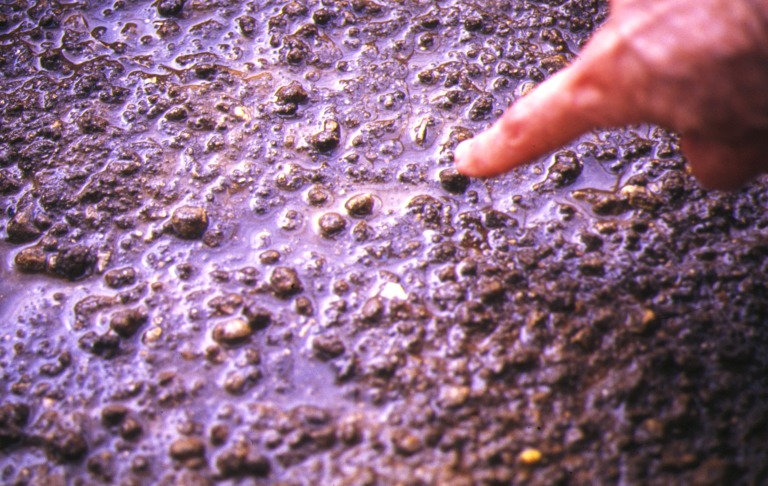
Rill initiation: the finger is pointing at a headcut which has just been incised by runoff which is flowing from right to left

Rills cannot form on every surface and their formation is intrinsically connected to the steepness of the hillside slope. Gravity determines the force of the water, which provides the power required to start the erosional environment necessary to create rills. Therefore, the formation of rills is primarily controlled by the slope of the hillside. Slope controls the depth of the rills, while the length of the slope and the soil's permeability control the number of incisions in an area. Each type of soil has a threshold value, a slope angle below which water velocity cannot produce sufficient force to dislodge enough soil particles for rills to form. For instance, on many non-cohesive slopes, this threshold value hovers around an angle of 2 degrees with a shear velocity between 3 and 3.5 cm/s.

After rills begin forming, they are subjected to variety of other erosional forces which may increase their size and output volume. Up to 37% of erosion in a rill-ridden area may derive from mass movement, or collapse, of rill sidewalls. As water flows through a rill, it will undercut into the walls, triggering collapse. Also, as water seeps into the soil of the walls, they weaken, amplifying the chance of wall collapse. The erosion created by these forces increases the size of the rill while also swelling its output volume.

Less commonly, dissolution of limestone and other soluble rocks by slightly acidic rainfall and runoff also results in the formation of rill-like features on the surface of the rock.

=== Significance of rill erosion ===
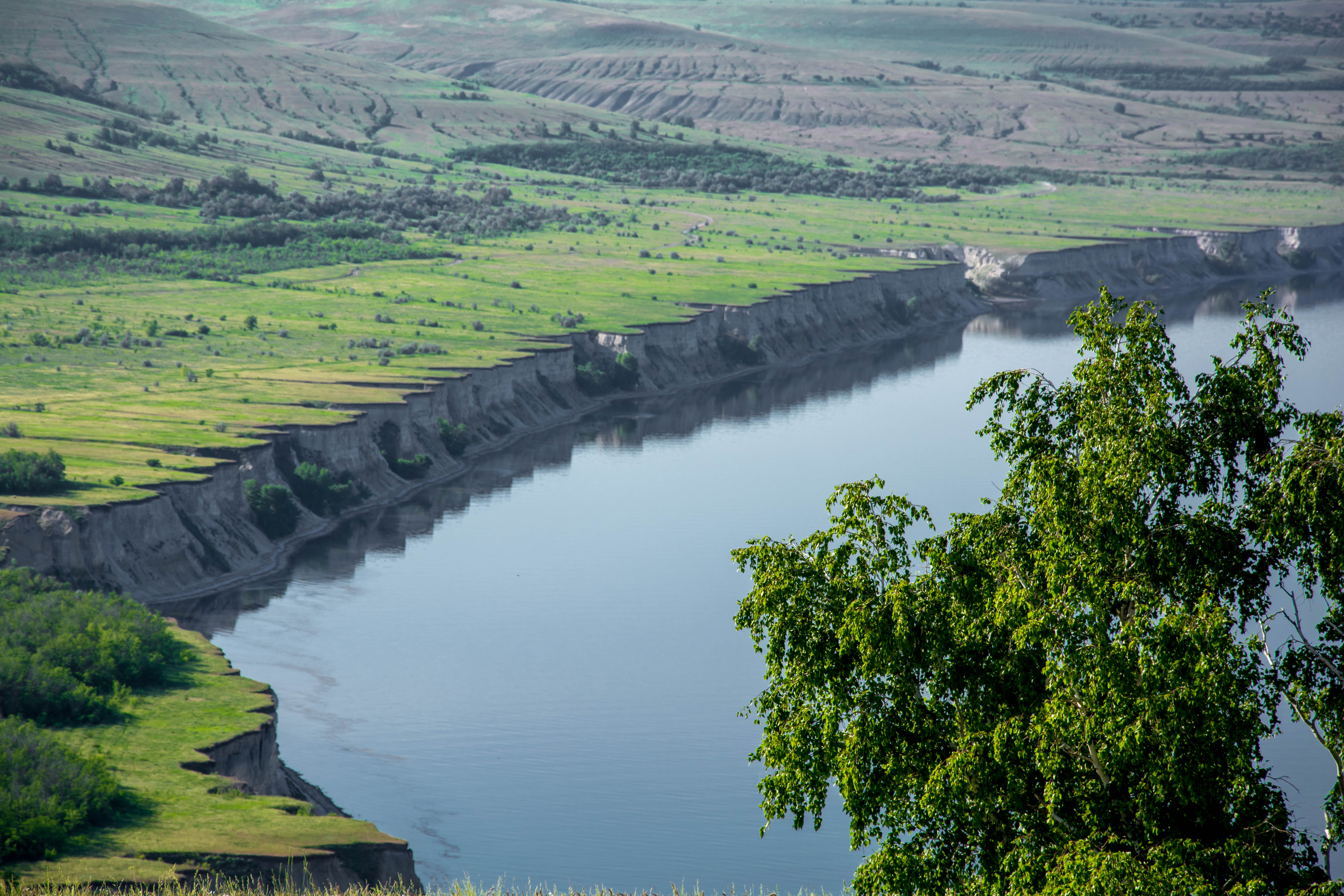
Landscape shaped by rill erosion. Volgograd Oblast, Russia.

Although rills are small, they transport significant amounts of soil each year. Some estimates claim rill flow has a carrying capacity of nearly ten times that of non-rill, or interrill, areas. In a moderate rainfall, rill flow can carry rock fragments up to 9 cm in diameter downslope. In 1987, scientist J. Poesen conducted an experiment on the Huldenberg field in Belgium which revealed that during a moderate rainfall, rill erosion removed as much as 200 kg (in submerged weight) of rock.

Unfortunately, rills' considerable effect on landscapes often negatively impacts human activity. Rills have been observed washing away archaeological sites. They are also very common in agricultural areas because sustained agriculture depletes the soil of much of its organic content, increasing the erodibility of the soil. Agricultural machines, such as tractors, compact the soil to the point where water flows over the surface rather than seeping into the soil. Tractor wheel impressions often channel water, providing a perfect environment for generating rills. These rills may erode considerable amounts of arable soil if left alone.

Under proper field management, rills are small and are easily repaired by contour tilling the soil. This will prevent, for a time at least, the rills from growing and eroding the landscape more rapidly with time.

== See also ==
- Aqueduct
- Chute (gravity)
- Flume
- Gully
- Leat
- Ravine
- Valley
- Pedosphere
- Zanja Madre
