= KSVB-LP =

Radio station in Big Bear City, California

- Big Bear City, California; United States
- Broadcast area: Big Bear Valley
- Frequency: 94.1 MHz
- Branding: KSVB 94.1 FM

Programming
- Format: Variety

Ownership
- Owner: Bear Valley Seniors and Veterans Assistance, Inc.

History
- First air date: June 2015
- Call sign meaning: "Seniors Veterans Big Bear"

Technical information
- Licensing authority: FCC
- Facility ID: 193717
- Class: L1
- ERP: 100 watts
- HAAT: 47 meters (154 ft)
- Transmitter coordinates: 34°14′44″N 116°51′42″W

Links
- Public license information: LMS
- Webcast: Listen live
- Website: www.ksvbfm.com

KSVB-LP (94.1 FM) is a low-power FM radio station in the Big Bear Valley of California. It is licensed to Big Bear City, and also serves Big Bear Lake, Fawnskin, Sugarloaf, Baldwin Lake, Erwin Lake, Holcomb Valley, Bluff Lake, and surrounding areas. In addition to terrestrial broadcasting, KSVB streams on TuneIn and Radio.Net.

KSVB-LP airs a variety format consisting of "oldies and obscurities", including B-sides, one hit wonders, rarities, and new artists. The station is an affiliate of the syndicated Pink Floyd program "Floydian Slip."

KSVB-LP is owned by Bear Valley Seniors and Veterans Assistance, Inc., a 501c(4) non-profit.

== History ==
The station was assigned the KSVB-LP call letters by the Federal Communications Commission on March 3, 2014. It received its FCC broadcast license on June 15, 2015.
