= Eye of God (disambiguation) =

The Eye of God usually refers to the Helix Nebula, also known as NGC 7293.

Eye of God or God's Eye may also refer to:

== Arts and entertainment ==
- Eye of God (film), a 1997 film by Tim Blake Nelson based on his 1993 play
- The Eye of God (film), a 1916 American film
- The Eye of God (novel), a 2013 novel by James Rollins
- "God's Eye", a song by Dave from the 2019 album Top Boy (A Selection of Music Inspired by the Series)
- "Gods Eyes", a song by Roddy Ricch from the 2019 album Please Excuse Me for Being Antisocial

== Religion ==
- The Eye of God (Big Bear), a sacred indigenous landmark in Big Bear City, California
- Eye of Providence, a Christian symbol
- God's eye, a spiritual and votive object

== Other uses ==
- God's Eye (professional wrestling), a Japanese professional wrestling stable
- NGC 1232, an intermediate spiral galaxy, also known as the Eye of God Galaxy
- Archimedean point, a hypothetical viewpoint, also known as God's-eye view
- Prohodna, a karst cave in Bulgaria, also known as God's Eyes or Eyes of God
