= Big Bear Valley Historical Museum =

Museum in California

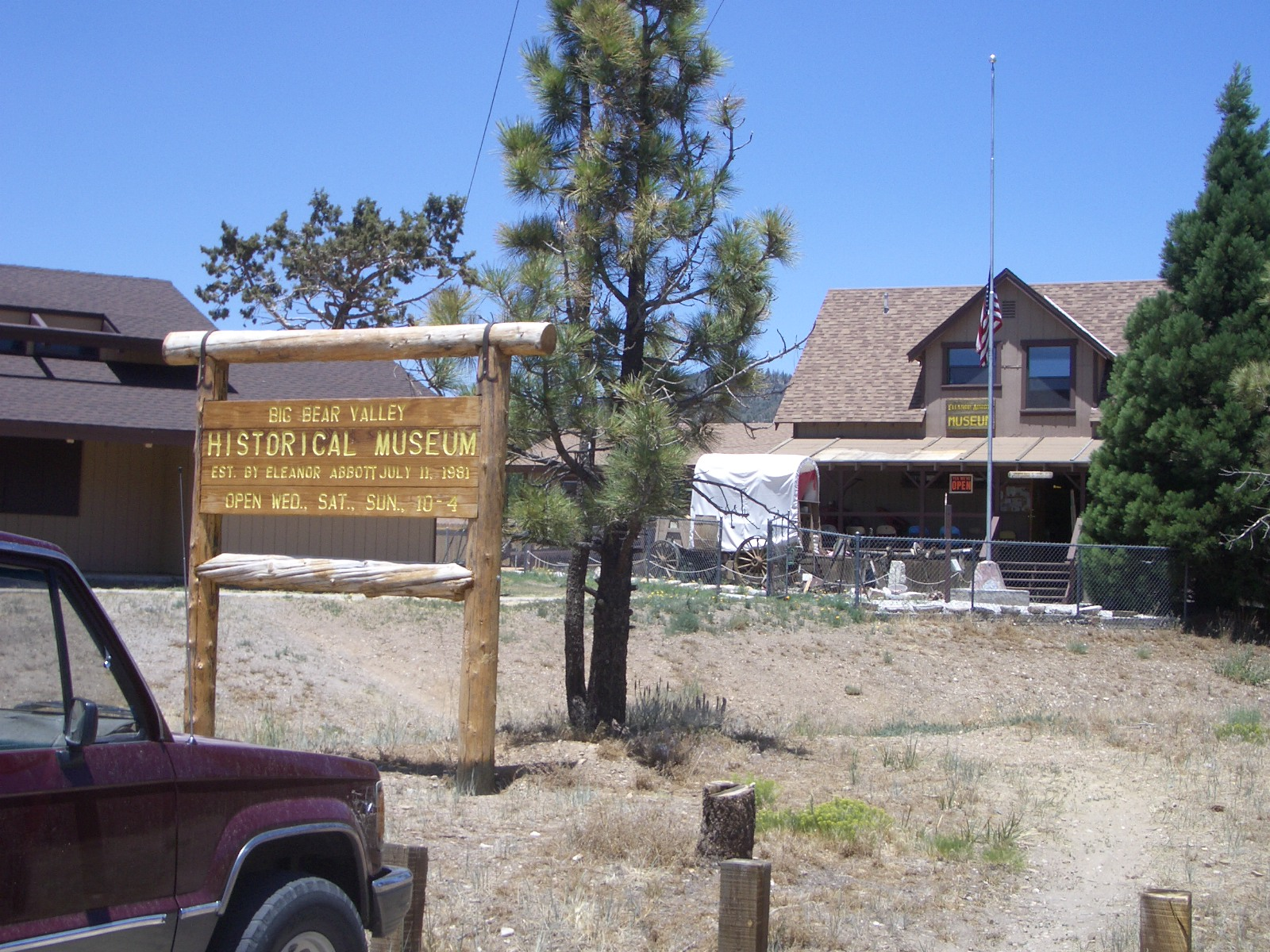
- The museum in 2004

- Location within California Location within the United States
- Established: June 12, 1982
- Location: 800 B Greenway Dr, Big Bear City, CA 92314
- Coordinates: 34.2650°N 116.8461°W
- Type: Historical museum
- Founder: Big Bear Valley Historical Society
- Website: www.bigbearvalleyhistory.com

The Big Bear Valley Historical Museum is a historical museum in Big Bear City, California. It first opened in 1982 and is operated by the Big Bear Valley Historical Society. The museum contains many artifacts and documents relating to life in Big Bear in its nine buildings.

== History ==
The Big Bear Valley Historical Society was founded in October 1967, with the goal of helping more people appreciate the history of Big Bear Valley, preserving historical artifacts, and researching historical aspects of the area. The museum first opened to the public on June 12, 1982, but the society had been collecting exhibits and documents since 1971. The building it is located in was originally the Big Bear Community Market.

The historical society moved the Juniper Point cabin, built in the 1920s, from the North Shore to the museum in April 2009. Local historian Tom Core formerly worked at the cabin pumping gas when he was a teenager in the late 1920s. In 2012, three members of the society accidentally stole a historic arrastre from the San Bernardino National Forest to bring it to the museum and restore it. They were each charged with a misdemeanor.

== Exhibits ==
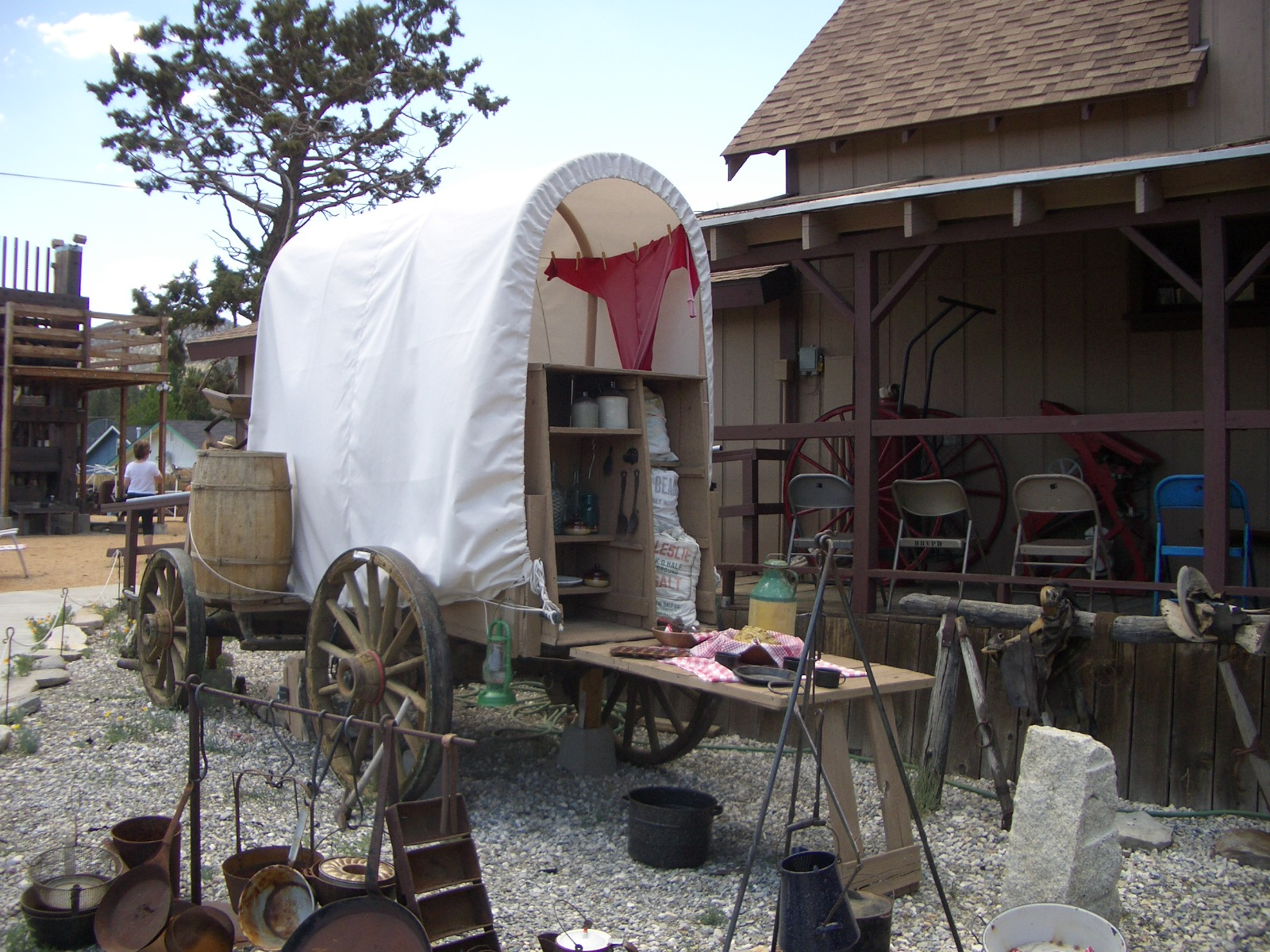
A wagon at the museum

The museum contains nine structures that contain exhibits. It includes a working blacksmith shop, a gold panning station, a stamp mill, and picnic grounds. The Shay Cabin and the stamp mill were transported to the museum by what was once the only crane in the valley. The Cienaga Log Cabin was built in 1875 and the Doble schoolhouse was built in 1901; it was formerly located in the now-ghost town of Doble, California. The oldest building in the city is also located in the museum; it was built in 1864.
