= Camp Gilboa =

U.S. summer camp in California for youth movement, Habonim Dror

Camp Gilboa is one of the six North American machanot (summer camp) associated with the socialist-Zionist youth movement, Habonim Dror North America (HDNA). Located near Big Bear Lake in California, it is open to children entering 3rd-10th grade, and incoming 12th graders are accepted as Madatz (counselors in training). All of the madrichimot (counselors) are young college-aged students who take part in the Habonim Dror movement.

== History ==
Habonim Dror (“the builders of freedom”) is the result of a 1982 merger between two groups, Habonim (formed in London in 1929 before coming to North America six years later) and the youth Zionist movement Dror.

Camp Gilboa has existed in the Los Angeles area since 1936, originally with the name Habonim Camp Kvutza Naame. The camp began in Saugus, then operated on its own site in Idyllwild in the 1960s and 1970s, closed in 1982, then reopened in 1995 and operated at rented camp facilities east of Los Angeles until 2010. In 2011, Gilboa purchased a 40-acre (16 ha) campsite from The Wildlands Conservancy in the pine-forested mountains of Big Bear Valley.

== Summer Camp ==
The summer camp runs for 6 weeks. Campers have the option of staying for the full summer or for shorter sessions. Each session has approximately 140 campers. Young campers (entering 3rd or 4th grade) have the option of a 4-day camp experience called Nitzanimot (seedlings).

As with other Habonim Dror camps, it instills the community-minded values of the kibbutz movement, but in an American Jewish context. Campers participate in traditional camp activities, such as hiking, kayaking, arts and crafts, and archery; there is also an emphasis is on "Israel, Hebrew, understanding current events and, most importantly, making campers personally responsible for the success of their Gilboa experience." According to a 2013 study, 85% of Habonim Dror alumni (including Gilboa) have visited Israel multiple times, 70% have lived in Israel for 5 months or more, and 75% consider themselves politically progressive.

HDNA camps attracted international attention with their transformation of many Hebrew words into gender neutral alternatives. For example, in traditional modern Hebrew, chanich means a male camper (plural is chanichim); chanichah means a female camper (plural is chanichot). At HDNA camps such as Gilboa, camper is the gender-neutral chanichol (plural is chanichimot).

== Age Groups ==
As with other HDNA camps, Camp Gilboa is attended by children finishing grades 3 through 9, who are split into schavot (age groups).

1. Post 2nd grade-Nitzanimot (“Taste of Gilboa”)
2. Post 3rd grade-Younger Goofimot
3. Post 4th grade-Amelimot (workers)
4. Post 5th grade- Sayarimot (patrollers)
5. Post 6th grade- Chotrimot (rowers)
6. Post 7th grade-Shomrimot (guards)
7. Post 8th grade-Bonimot (builders)
8. Post 9th grade-Bogrimot (graduates)
9. Post 10th grade- Machaneh Bonim Israel (MBI; Building Camp in Israel) or Machhaneh Bonim Gilboa (MBG)

== Year-Round Programming ==
In addition to summer camps, HDNA has 16 chapters, called kenim (nests) in Canada and the US that operate during the school year. Three kenim are associated with Camp Gilboa, in Los Angeles, Berkeley, and San Diego. One program during the school year is the Bonimot Tzedek Leadership Development Program supporting teens, college students and young adults. Camp Gilboa teens help run youth programming in Los Angeles, such as a day camp for young students during the 2019 LAUSD teachers strike, and partner with community organizations in social action activities in both Northern and Southern California, including a donation drive for refugees, a seder for the downtown community, and interfaith vigils and interfaith programs.

== Other Machanot (camps) ==
Habonim Dror has six active camps in North America, five of which were originally Habonim and one of which was originally Dror. All the other Dror Machanot have folded. The camps are called (and located in) Miriam (Vancouver, Canada), Tavor (MI), Gesher (Ontario, Canada), Moshava (MD), Galil (PA), and Gilboa (CA). Gesher was originally Dror.

== Habonim Dror leadership programs ==
Post 10th graders from Gilboa participate with 10th graders from all 6 Habonim Dror North America camps in a summer program in Israel called Machaneh Bonim b'Israel (MBI). Post-10th graders can also attend US-based programs such as MBG or Kadima.

Post 11th graders engage in a summer leadership program called Madatz. This is a tochnit (program) dedicated to developing hadracha (leadership) and heightening the sense of kvutsah (group), similar to a CIT type experience and most of the graduates go on to become Madrachim (counselors) the following summers and youth leaders during the school year.

Post 12th graders participate in the Habonim Dror year program in Israel, Workshop, which is the longest running North American gap-year program in Israel.

== Facilities ==
Camp Gilboa bought its 40-acre (16 ha) camp on Bluff Lake in the San Bernardino National Forest, at an elevation of 7,600 feet (2,300 m) near Big Bear Lake, in 2011 for $2.5 million from The Wildlands Conservancy, which had purchased and renovated the property five years earlier. The property includes a large dining hall, amphitheater, swimming pool, sports field, basketball court, and archery range. Bluff Lake is immediately adjacent to the camp and is available to campers for kayaking.

The summer camp scenes from the Walt Disney film, The Parent Trap (1961 film) were filmed at the camp, then known as Bluff Lake Camp, owned at that time by the Pasadena YMCA. Scenes from Dr. Dolittle 2, starring Eddie Murphy, were filmed at Bluff Lake.

== Notable alumni ==
Notable alumni include:

1. Zev Yaroslavsky
