= Sugarloaf Mountain (San Bernardino County, California) =

Mountain of the San Bernardino Mountains in California

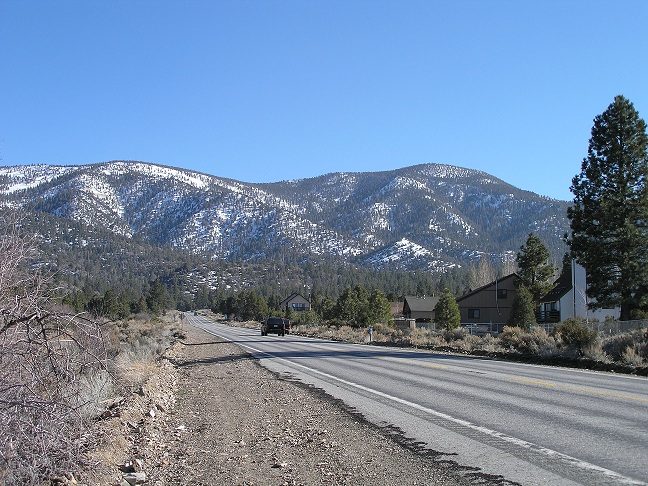
Sugarloaf from Highway 38, April 2006. Sugarloaf is the peak on the right.

Sugarloaf Mountain is a large prominent peak in the San Bernardino Mountains in Southern California. With a peak elevation of 9,952 feet (3,033 m), it is the highest peak in the San Bernardino Mountains outside the San Gorgonio Wilderness. Wilderness permits are not required to hike the peak, but a Forest Service pass is required to park on any fire road. Sugarloaf Mountain is clearly visible in most parts of Big Bear Valley. The peak is especially prominent when entering the Big Bear area from Highway 18 from the Lucerne Valley. Located in a unique transition zone in Southern California, the climate is influenced by the deserts, the inland valley, and alpine climates. The north face of the summit is usually covered with snow during the winter months.

== Flora and fauna ==
The flora and fauna of Sugarloaf Mountain are representative of a transitional zone between inland desert, mountain, and inland valley climates. The mountain and surrounding forests are home to many rare and endemic plant species. Looming 3,000 feet (910 m) over the southern part of the Big Bear Valley and the village of Sugarloaf, the northern slopes of the mountain are heavily forested with second-growth Jeffrey Pine and White Firs. At higher altitudes on the north-facing slope, Limber and Lodgepole Pines near the summit are twisted into Krummholz formations. The forest on the east facing slope is drier, and the vegetation shows the influence of the Mojave Desert; sagebrush and junipers are more dominant. The southern slope of the mountain is covered in scrubby manzanita bushes and extensive rock scree, with a few hardy Jeffery pines. Snow rarely stays more than few days once the sun shines on the southern face, while the much cooler northern face is covered with snow from early December to late May.

A year-round spring on the north face forms a small creek that travels to the Greenspot Meadows, which is an excellent birding spot during the spring and summer. The northern slopes were formerly home to herds of wild burros that could be seen from Wildhorse Meadows Road. The Bureau of Land Management removed most of the burros from the Sugarloaf area, but some animals travel there from the lower deserts. Cougars and bears have been spotted in the forests to the west of the peak. In late spring, butterflies may be seen at the rock scree close to the summit.

== Gallery ==
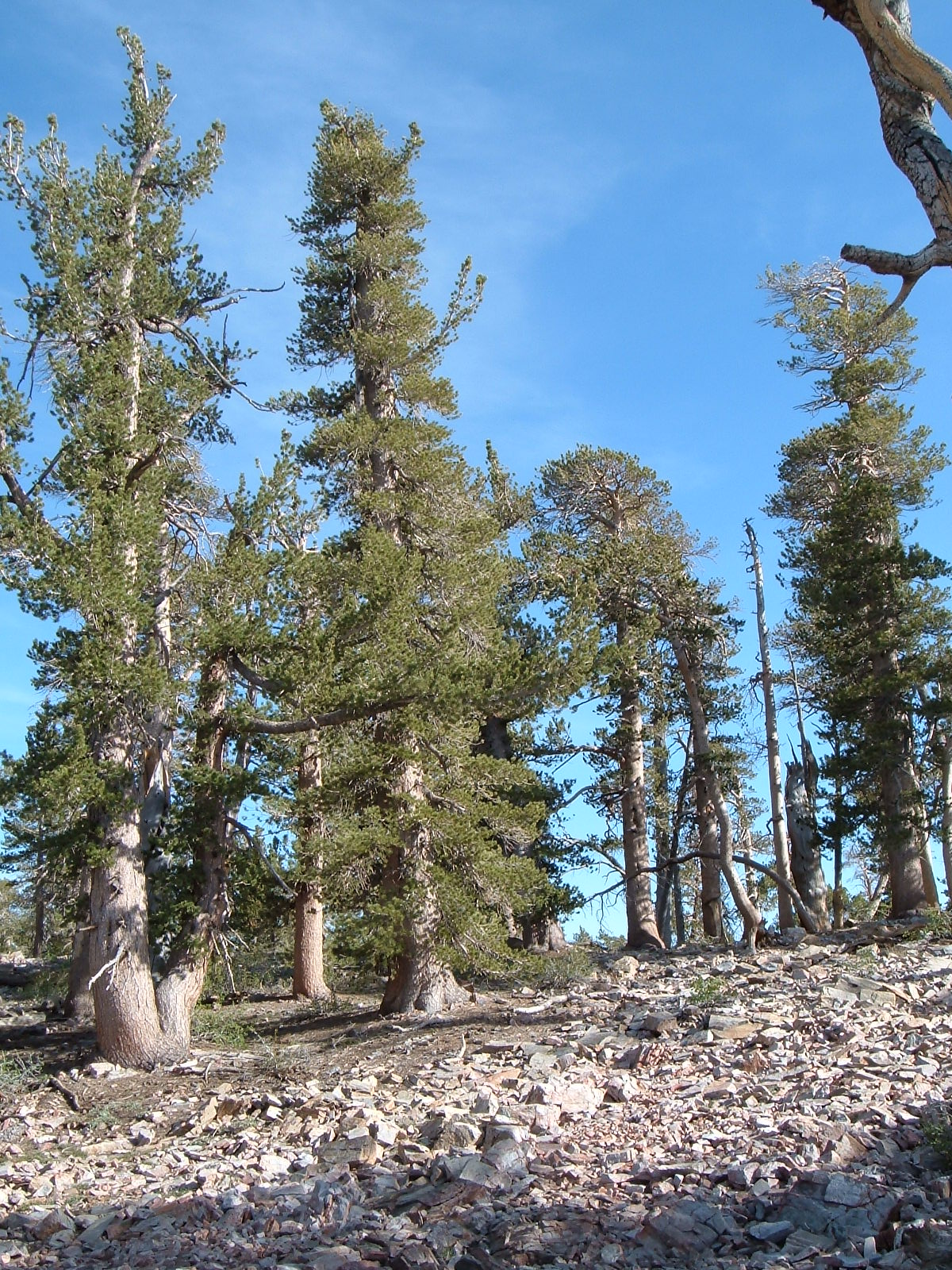
Rocky slopes with Limber and Lodgepole Pines 500 feet (150 m) below the summit

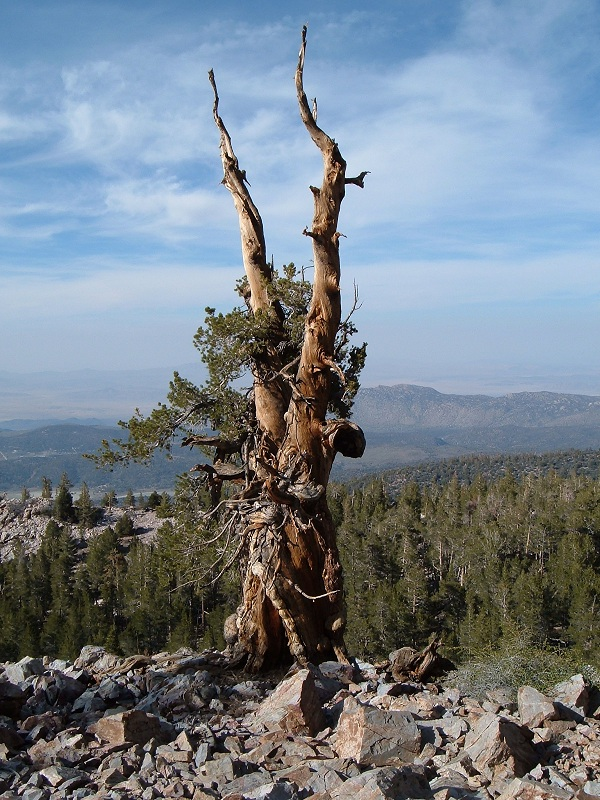
Weather-beaten limber pine near the summit. The Mojave Desert is in the background.

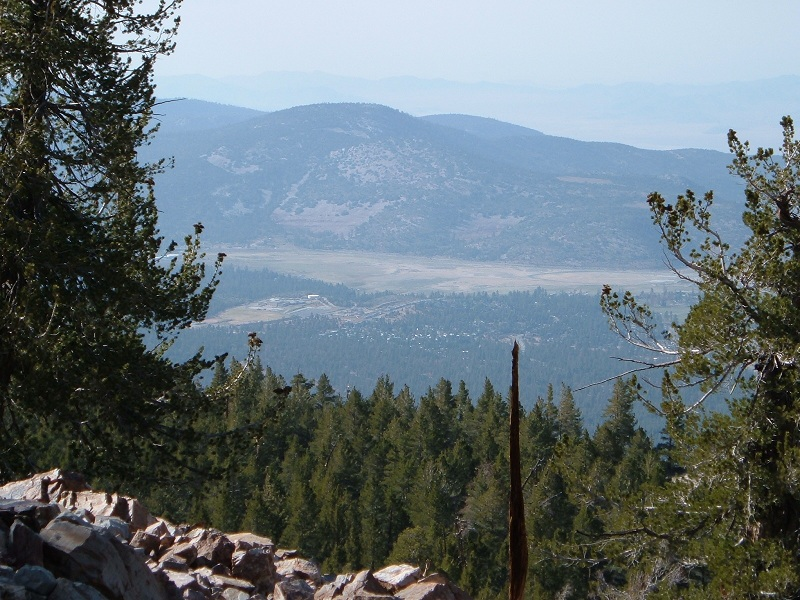
Looking 3,000 feet (910 m) down into Big Bear Valley from the summit

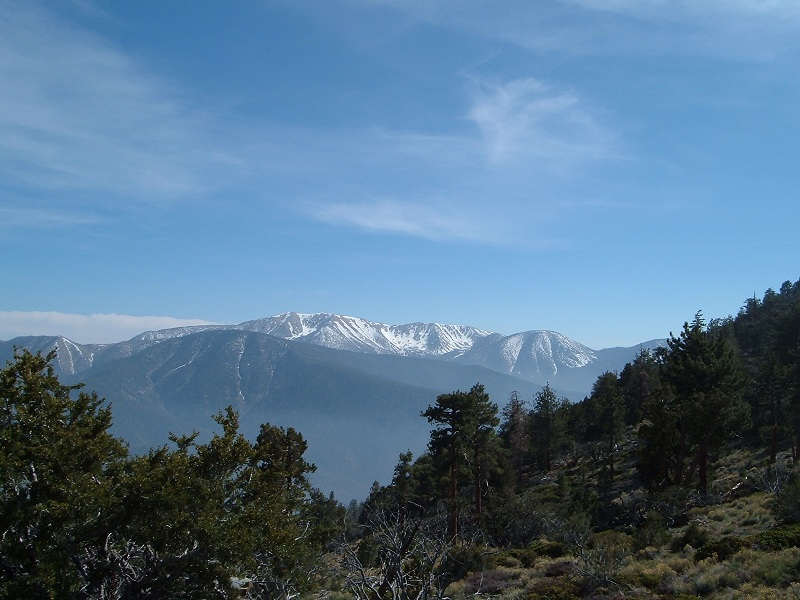
View of Mt. San Gorgonio to the south from the saddle of Sugarloaf

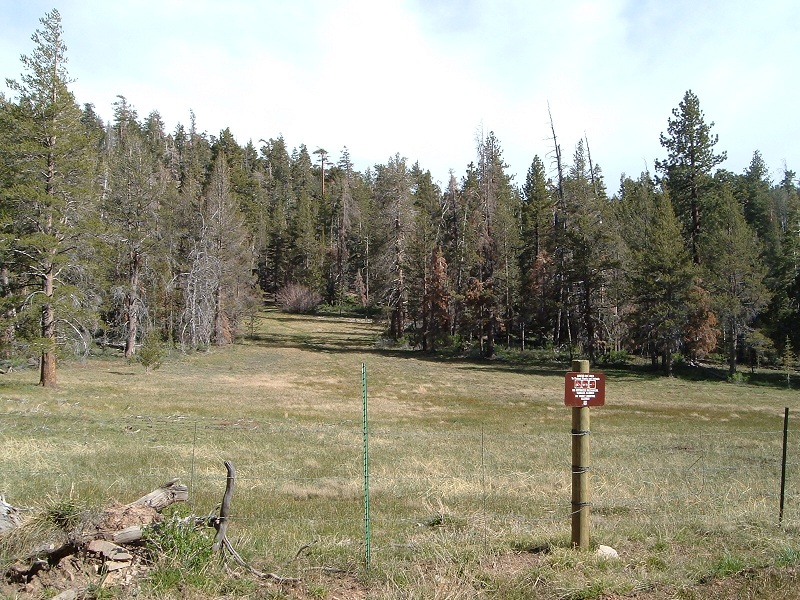
Wildhorse Meadows

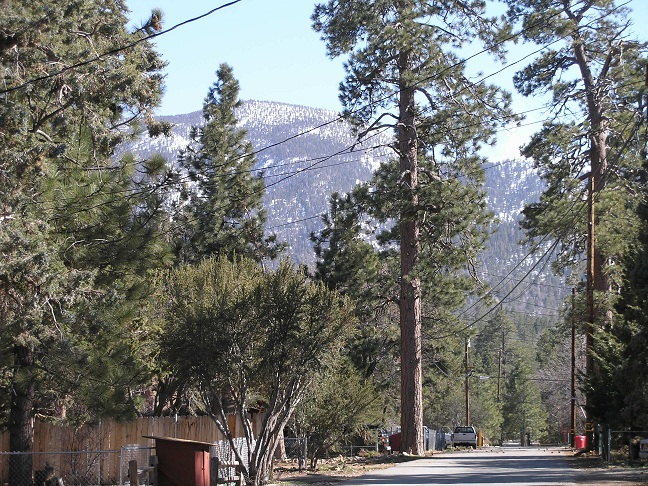
View of north face from the town of Sugarloaf

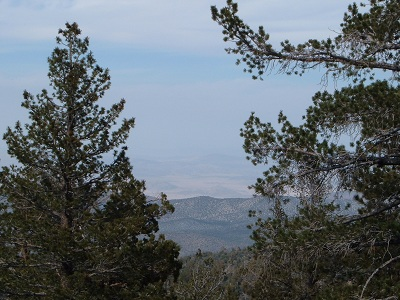
The Mojave Desert is in the distance looking north-east from the summit

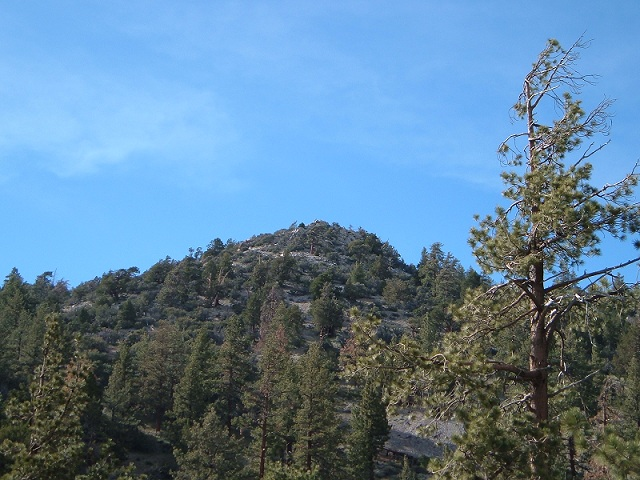
Hiking towards the summit
