= Big Bear City Airport =

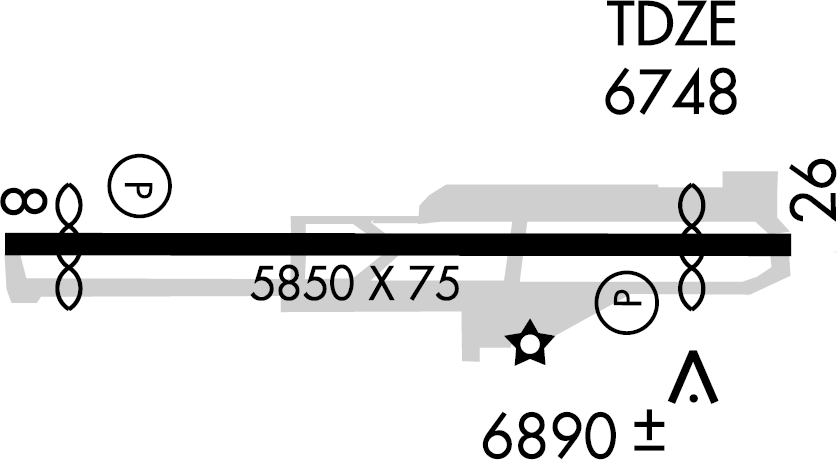

- Big Bear L 35 short final
- IATA: RBF; ICAO: none; FAA LID: L35

Summary
- Airport type: Public
- Owner: Big Bear Airport District
- Serves: San Bernardino and Big Bear Lake
- Location: Big Bear City, California
- Elevation AMSL: 6,752 ft (2,058 m)
- Coordinates: 34°15′50″N 116°51′22″W
- Website: BigBearCityAirport.com
- Interactive map of Big Bear City Airport

Runways
Direction	Length		Surface
Direction	ft	m	Surface
8/26	5,850	1,783	Asphalt

Statistics (2004)
- Aircraft operations: 30,000
- Based aircraft: 141
- Source: Federal Aviation Administration

Big Bear City Airport (IATA: RBF, FAA LID: L35) is a high-elevation public airport, operated by the Big Bear Airport District, located in the San Bernardino Mountains in Big Bear City, California, United States.

== Facilities and aircraft ==
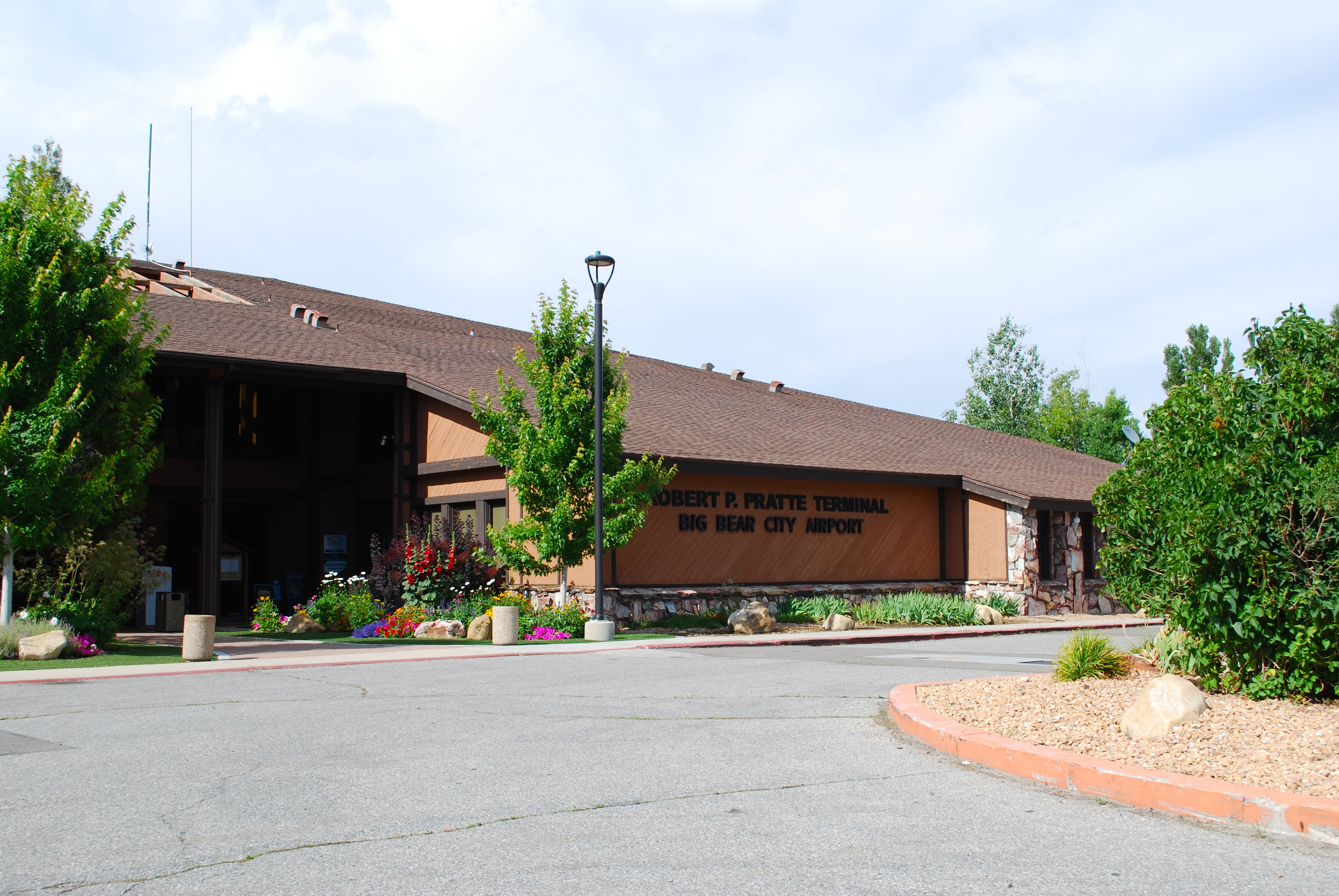
Big Bear City Airport building

Big Bear City Airport covers an area of 117 acres (47 ha) which contains one asphalt paved runway (8/26) measuring 5,850 x 75 ft (1,783 x 23 m).

In 2004, the airport had 30,000 aircraft operations, an average of 82 per day: 93% general aviation and 7% military. There are 141 aircraft based at this airport: 94% single engine, 3% multi-engine, 2% ultralight and 1% glider.

== Specific flight rules ==
Big Bear City Airport has published specific flight rules for aircraft. Currently, the established procedure is for inbound traffic to fly in over the ski slopes at 9,500 feet, and for departing traffic to fly at or below 8,500 feet. As this airport is at fairly high altitude and routinely experiences density altitudes of 9,000 feet or higher, it is important (perhaps more than usual) for pilots to double-check the performance tables in their aircraft manuals to ensure that they will be able to take off. The flight rules also contain noise abatement procedures that help the airport, its tenants, and its guests to be better neighbors to the community.

The calm wind runway (26) ends at the eastern terminus of Big Bear Lake. There is no suitable landing area for several miles, as the terrain is covered almost completely with coniferous trees and houses. If an airplane can make it over the lake and past the dam, its pilot will enjoy "instant altitude" - there is a deep fissure between mountain ridges that leads roughly south towards San Bernardino. One must be cautious of possible turbulence and mountain wave/rotor activity in this area, but aside from that, it is an option for pilots who are having trouble climbing or maintaining altitude.

== Historical airline service ==
In 1947, Los Angeles Air Service had scheduled Douglas DC-3 service from Los Angeles Municipal Airport (today's LAX) to Big Bear.

In 1988, Alpha Air, a commuter airline based in southern California which subsequently became a Trans World Express air carrier flying on behalf of TWA, was operating nonstop service from the airport to Los Angeles International Airport (LAX).
