= Gold Mountain Manor =

Hotel in Big Bear City, California, United States

Coordinates: 34.2703°N 116.8491°W

- Interactive map of the Gold Mountain Manor area

General information
- Type: Hotel
- Classification: Lodging, weddings, bed & breakfasts
- Location: 1117 Anita Avenue, Big Bear City, California, United States
- Opened: 1928

Other information
- Number of rooms: 7
- Parking: Self parking

Website
- http://www.goldmountainmanor.com

Gold Mountain Manor is a rustic hotel, bed & breakfast, and wedding venue on the north shore of Big Bear City, California. Built in 1928 by Los Angeles movie investor Alexander Buchanan Barret and his wife, Bessie, Gold Mountain Manor is currently owned and managed by Darrin and Amy Odell.

== The complex ==
A restored log mansion sits on an acre of property near Big Bear Lake. It was built in an Adirondak-style with a wide wooden porch, seven themed guestrooms, and a gourmet eatery, and provides wedding accommodations.

== Amenities ==
Guestrooms feature private baths and original log beds, and select rooms have stone fireplaces and jacuzzi tubs. Common areas include television entertainment, bed & breakfast services, and afternoon hors d’oeuvres.

Guests can kayak on Big Bear Lake, hike and bike trails, and go snowshoeing.
