= Big Bear High School =

Location
- 351 Maple Lane; Big Bear City, California, California 92315; United States
- Coordinates: 34°15′15″N 116°49′30″W

Information
- School type: Public high school
- Motto: Go Bears!
- School district: Bear Valley Unified School District
- Principal: Tina Fulmer
- Teaching staff: 35.63 (FTE)
- Grades: 9-12
- Enrollment: 626 (2023-2024)
- Student to teacher ratio: 17.57
- Colors: Red, White, and Black
- Nickname: Bears
- Website: Big Bear High School

Big Bear High School is a high school in Big Bear City, California. It is the only conventional high school in the Bear Valley Unified School District. It was established as an institution in 1948 but has since moved to a new building.

== Athletics ==
Big Bear High School offers programs such as Football, Baseball, Basketball (Boys and Girls), Volleyball, Softball, Wrestling, Golf, Tennis, Cross Country, and Soccer. Big Bear High is associated with the CIF program.

- Boys' cross country team won the California state championship 3 years in a row from 2006-2008. The team has also had three boys finish individually in the Top 3 at the National Championships held each December.

== Notable alumni ==
- Ryan Hall Olympian, fastest American-born marathoner in history
- Jordan Romero, the youngest person ever to climb Mount Everest and the Seven Summits, the highest point on all seven continents
