= Bluff Lake (San Bernardino County, California) =

Lake in the state of California, United States

- Location within California Location within the United States
- Location: San Bernardino County, California
- Coordinates: 34°13′13″N 116°58′08″W
- Type: Lake
- Surface elevation: 7,600 feet (2,300 m)

Bluff Lake is a lake in the Big Bear Valley of the San Bernardino Mountains, in San Bernardino County, California. It is located southwest of Big Bear Lake reservoir and Big Bear City. Part of the natural area is old-growth forest and recognized by the Old-Growth Forest Network.

== Geography ==
Located in one of Southern California’s only alpine meadows, the lake sits at a surface elevation of 7,600 feet (2,300 m).

== Bluff Lake Reserve ==
Bluff Lake Reserve includes a pine forest, a 20-acre (8.1 ha) lake and meadow, and outcrops of quartz monzonite. The reserve includes a mountain marsh and meadow complex that contains the federally threatened Bear Valley bluegrass (Poa atropurpurea), the federally endangered Big Bear checkerbloom (Sidalcea pedata) and California dandelion (Taraxacum californicum). Botanical features in the meadow include 16 species of sedges (Carex), eight species of wire grass (Juncus) and 14 species of native grass. Mature forests of lodgepole pine, Jeffrey pine, and white fir surround the meadow.

== History ==
In 1899, Gus Knight and Hiram Clark (Clark Grade Road) built the Bear Valley and Redlands Toll Road via the Santa Ana Canyon past Bluff Lake. Early buses known as White Stages paused near Bluff Lake on their way to Big Bear Lake in 1915.

After acquiring this preserve in 2000, The Wildlands Conservancy drained the lake to eliminate non-native catfish to restore the native aquatic systems that had been decimated by artificially stocked lakes in Southern California.

In 2011, Camp Gilboa bought the 40-acre (16 ha) camp on Bluff Lake from The Wildlands Conservancy, which had purchased and renovated the property five years earlier.

The summer camp scenes from the Walt Disney film, The Parent Trap (1961 film) were filmed at the camp, then known as Bluff Lake Camp, owned at that time by the Pasadena YMCA. Dr. Dolittle 2, starring Eddie Murphy, was filmed at Bluff Lake.
