= Bear Valley Unified School District =

School district in California

Coordinates: 34.2441°N 116.8820°W

Address
- 42271 Moonridge Road Big Bear Lake, San Bernardino, California, 92315; United States

District information
- Type: Public
- Grades: Kindergarten – Grade 12
- NCES District ID: 0604230

Students and staff
- Students: 2,238 (2020–2021)
- Teachers: 102.71 (FTE)
- Staff: 86.48 (FTE)
- Student–teacher ratio: 21.79:1

Other information
- Website: www.bearvalleyusd.org

Bear Valley Unified School District is a school district in San Bernardino County, California, supporting the towns of the Big Bear area such as Boulder Bay, Fawnskin, Big Bear City, Big Bear Lake, Surgarloaf, etc. The district serves seven schools: Big Bear Elementary, North Shore Elementary, Baldwin Lane Elementary, Fallsvale Elementary (which is not in Big Bear), Big Bear Middle School, Big Bear High School, and Chautauqua High School (a continuation school).

== History ==
Big Bear Elementary School is the first and oldest school in the Bear Valley. The school was called Big Bear School and it served students from K-12th grades. Later in 1948, the growth of the population made Big Bear build its first high school, which is now Big Bear Middle School. As the years passed, the population kept rising dramatically due to the new ski resort [Snow Summit], which was created in 1954, and many new tourist attractions. As a result of this, Big Bear built a newer high school in the Sugarloaf community of Big Bear. The old Big Bear High School was changed to Big Bear Middle School. Big Bear Middle school was at first attended by 6-8 graders. In the 1996-1997 school year it then only taught 7th and 8th grade and the 6th grade classes were transferred to the 3 elementary schools based on location. By this time the district had 3 schools: Big Bear Elementary, Big Bear Middle School, and Big Bear High School. During the 1970s and 1980s Big Bear formed North Shore Elementary, and Baldwin Lane Elementary in the 1990s. The district then added Fallsvale Elementary to the list. The district has been that way ever since.

== Elementary schools ==
- Big Bear Elementary- located on 40940 Pennsylvania Ave. Principal Scott Waner. Official website
- North Shore Elementary- located on 765 North Stanfield Cutoff. Principal Manny Marquez Official website
- Baldwin Lane Elementary- located on 44500 Baldwin Lane. Principal Melinda Peterson. Official website
- Fallsvale School- located on 40600 Valley of the Falls Drive. Forest Falls, California 92339 Principal Lisa Hahn. Official website

== Middle schools ==
- Big Bear Middle School- located on 41275 Big Bear Blvd. Principal Dena Arbaugh. Official website
- Fallsvale School- located on 40600 Valley of the Falls Drive. Forest Falls, California 92339 Principal Lisa Hahn. Official website

== High schools ==
- Big Bear High School- located on 351 Maple Lane. Principal Tina Fulmer. Official website
- Chautauqua High School- located right next to Big Bear High School (a continuation school) Official website
