= Linanthus killipii =

Scientific classification
- Kingdom: Plantae
- Clade: Tracheophytes
- Clade: Angiosperms
- Clade: Eudicots
- Clade: Asterids
- Order: Ericales
- Family: Polemoniaceae
- Genus: Linanthus
- Species: L. killipii

Binomial name
- Linanthus killipii H.Mason

Species of flowering plant

Linanthus killipii, known by the common name Baldwin Lake linanthus, is a rare species of flowering plant in the phlox family.

== Distribution ==
The plant is endemic to the San Bernardino Mountains of southern California, where it is known from only a few occurrences in the vicinity of Baldwin Lake, a natural intermittent alkali lake near to the east of Big Bear Lake reservoir. It grows at elevations of 1,700–2,400 metres (5,600–7,900 ft).

The wildflower is a member of the flora in the rare quartz pebble plain habitat type on the north side of the lake, and of open meadows in the adjacent montane chaparral, pinyon-juniper woodland, and red fir forest habitats. The diversity of Big Bear Valley Pebble Plains species has been compared to that of coral reefs, and include 17 protected plant species and four rare kinds of butterflies.

== Description ==
Linanthus killipii is a small annual herb producing a hairy stem from 5–15 centimetres (2.0–5.9 in) tall. The leaves are divided into needle-like linear lobes each up to 1 centimetre (0.39 in) in length.

The inflorescence is an array of a few tiny flowers, each funnel-shaped with white lobes marked with purple at the bases and joined at a yellow throat. The bloom period is May and June.

== Conservation ==
The pebble plain population is within the Baldwin Lake Ecological Reserve Other populations are threatened by development and vehicles. It is a listed Endangered species on the California Native Plant Society Inventory of Rare and Endangered Plants.
