= Trans International Airlines =

US charter/lower-cost airline (1946–1986)

Transamerica Airlines Trans International Airlines Los Angeles Air Service
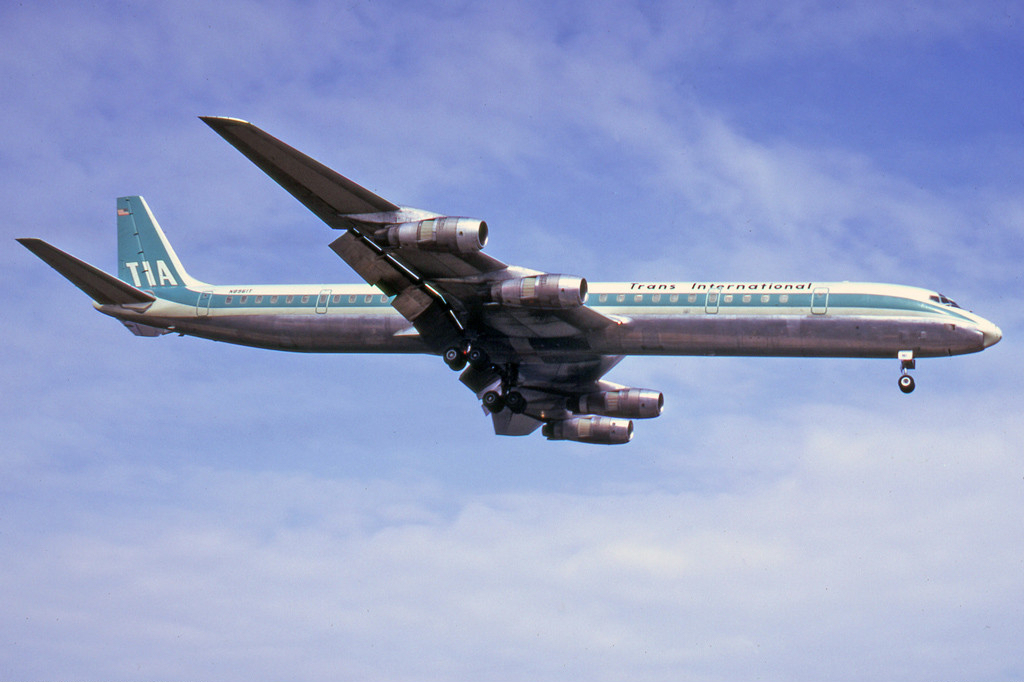
- A Douglas DC-8-61CF in April 1974.
IATA	ICAO	Call sign
TV; TV^{(1)}	TVA; TV^{(1)}	TRANS-AMERICA; TRANS INTERNATIONAL
- Founded: 20 December 1948 incorporated in California
- Commenced operations: January 1946 as Los Angeles Air Service; 18 July 1960 as Trans International Airlines; 1 October 1979 as Transamerica Airlines
- Ceased operations: 30 September 1986
- Operating bases: Oakland, California
- Fleet size: See Fleet below
- Destinations: See Destinations below
- Parent company: Studebaker (1962–1964); Transamerica Corporation (1968–1986)
- Headquarters: Oakland, California; Las Vegas, Nevada
- Key people: Kirk Kerkorian; Lee Taylor; James Porter

Notes
- (1) IATA, ICAO codes were the same until the 1980s

Trans International Airlines (TIA), later Transamerica Airlines, was a United States airline. Regulated as a supplemental air carrier, it offered a hybrid of chartered and scheduled services. TIA was founded as Los Angeles Air Service (LAAS) in the 1940s and flew scheduled service to Hawaii as late as 1961.

Businessman Kirk Kerkorian owned the airline from 1948 to 1962 and again from 1964 to 1968, when he sold it to insurance company Transamerica Corporation. After buying Saturn Airways in 1976 TIA became the largest USA supplemental carrier. After the Airline Deregulation Act of 1979, the airline changed its name to Transamerica and added limited scheduled service. In 1986 Transamerica Corporation, reversing earlier diversification, tried to sell the airline, but liquidated it instead.

In 1984, while Transamerica Airlines was seeking wage cuts, Transamerica Corporation started a second Trans International Airlines, as a non-union subsidiary. Transamerica Corporation set a legal precedent for being allowed to own separate union and non-union airline subsidiaries.

== History ==
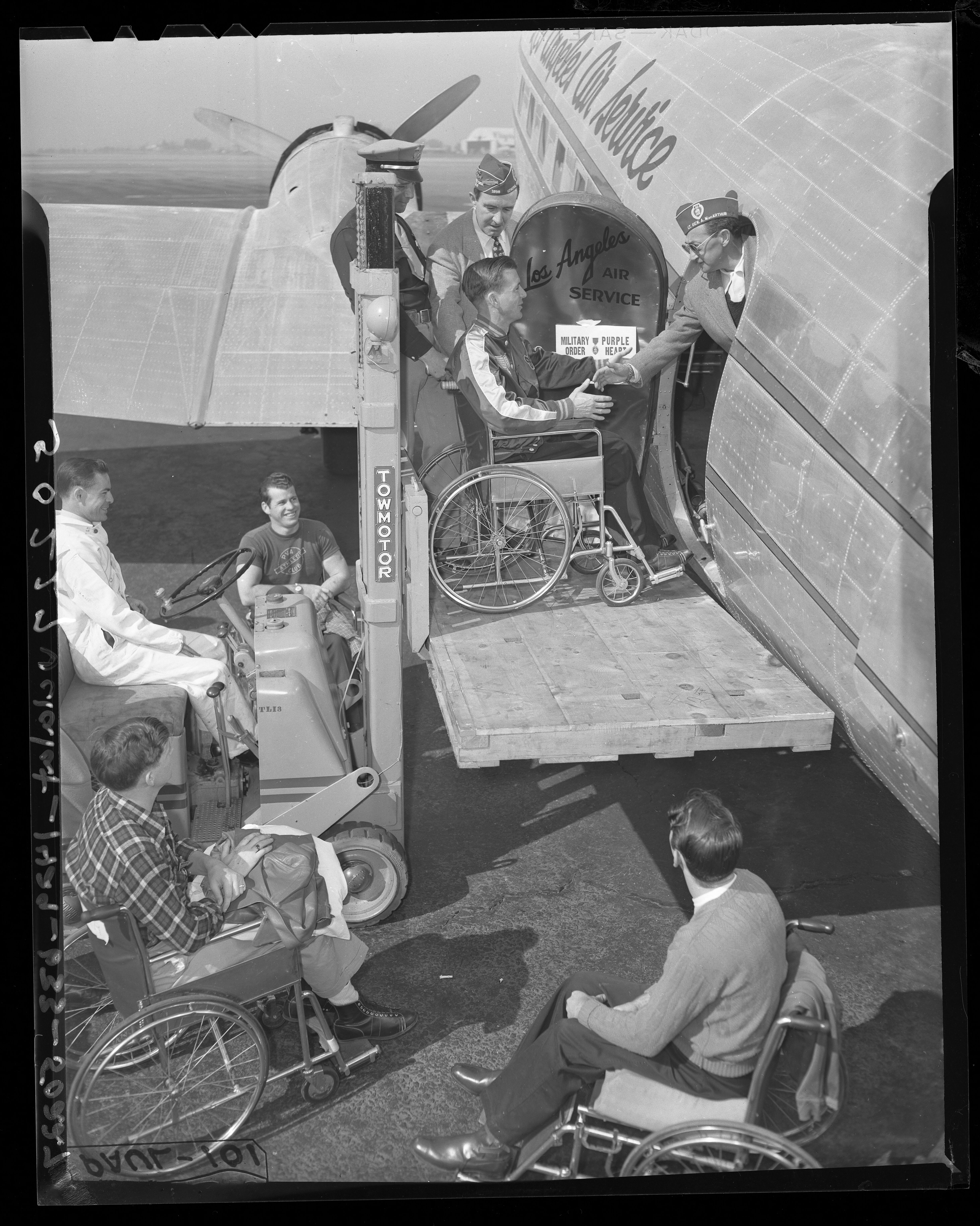
Pre-Kerkorian Los Angeles Air Service DC-3, Burbank Airport in February 1948

=== Startup ===
Kirk Kerkorian was a pilot in World War II, engaged in pilot instruction and aircraft delivery across the Atlantic, including a record-setting nonstop flight of a deHavilland Mosquito from Canada to the UK.

In January 1946, Kerkorian and his sister formed a partnership to trade aircraft. This activity attracted significant attention when, in October 1946, while Kerkorian was flying a war-surplus Douglas DC-3 from Hawaii to the mainland, the ferry tank system malfunctioned and the engines quit. His crew issued a distress call before it was able to restore power, leading to news stories.

Los Angeles Air Service (LAAS) was a separate nonscheduled airline, later known as an irregular air carrier or supplemental air carrier. LAAS was in operation with a C-47 as early as January 1946. In 1946, LAAS's presence was noted at LaGuardia in March, Chicago in April and LAAS advertised a charter flight to Alaska from Seattle in May. In 1947, LAAS started a scheduled DC-3 service from Los Angeles Municipal Airport to Big Bear, at which time its owners/operators were James Porter and Lee Taylor.

Kerkorian's partnership bought LAAS in June 1948, which on 13 August 1948 was issued a Letter of Registration by the CAB as an irregular air carrier (what the CAB then issued to such airlines in lieu of a certificate). Kerkorian incorporated Los Angeles Air Service, Inc., in California on 20 December 1948, a separate entity from the original LAAS. However, it was only on 5 April 1951 that the Letter of Registration was transferred from the LAAS partnership to the LAAS corporation, thereby making the corporate entity the airline.

=== Los Angeles Air Service ===
Under Kerkorian, LAAS operated intermittently; it operated no flights at all from 3rd quarter of 1951 through 1st quarter of 1954, and had minimal operations in 1957 and 1958 (see Table 1). In September 1957, the CAB warned LAAS to operate within the next 30 days or lose operating authority, the airline having sold all its aircraft. Kerkorian's interests were as much in aircraft trading as airline operation: when Kerkorian took a stake in a Las Vegas casino in 1955, Variety Magazine referred to him not an airline operator but as an airplane dealer. Kerkorian made some famous deals through LAAS. For instance, in 1951, LAAS bought the wreckage of a British Overseas Airways Corporation (BOAC) Constellation in the UK from BOAC's insurers, shipped it to the US and had Lockheed rebuild it, leasing it to California Hawaiian Airlines, another irregular airline. All-told, the deal netted Kerkorian over a half-million dollars (over $5.5 million in 2025 dollars). See External links for photos of LAAS C-46 and DC-4 aircraft.

Table 1: Los Angeles Air Service financial results, 1952–1960(1) Did not operate(2) All supplemental air carriers
USD 000	1952^{(1)}	1953^{(1)}	1954	1955	1956	1957	1958	1959	1960
Operating revenue:									
Military charter			624	1,032	1,950	21	31	1,315	1,652
Civilian charter			64	8	49	4	5	249	279
Scheduled			27	59	10	0	0	0	939
Other			0	1	0	313	184	78	0
Total	0	0	715	1,100	2,009	338	220	1,642	2,870
Profit (loss) before taxes	0	1	34	3	(5)	(169)	(249)	(69)	287
Operating revenue:									
% of industry^{(2)}	0.0	0.0	1.3	1.4	3.0	0.7	0.3	2.1	3.4
Industry^{(2)} rank	NA	NA	21	18	15	23	24	7	7

=== Trans International and Hawaii ===
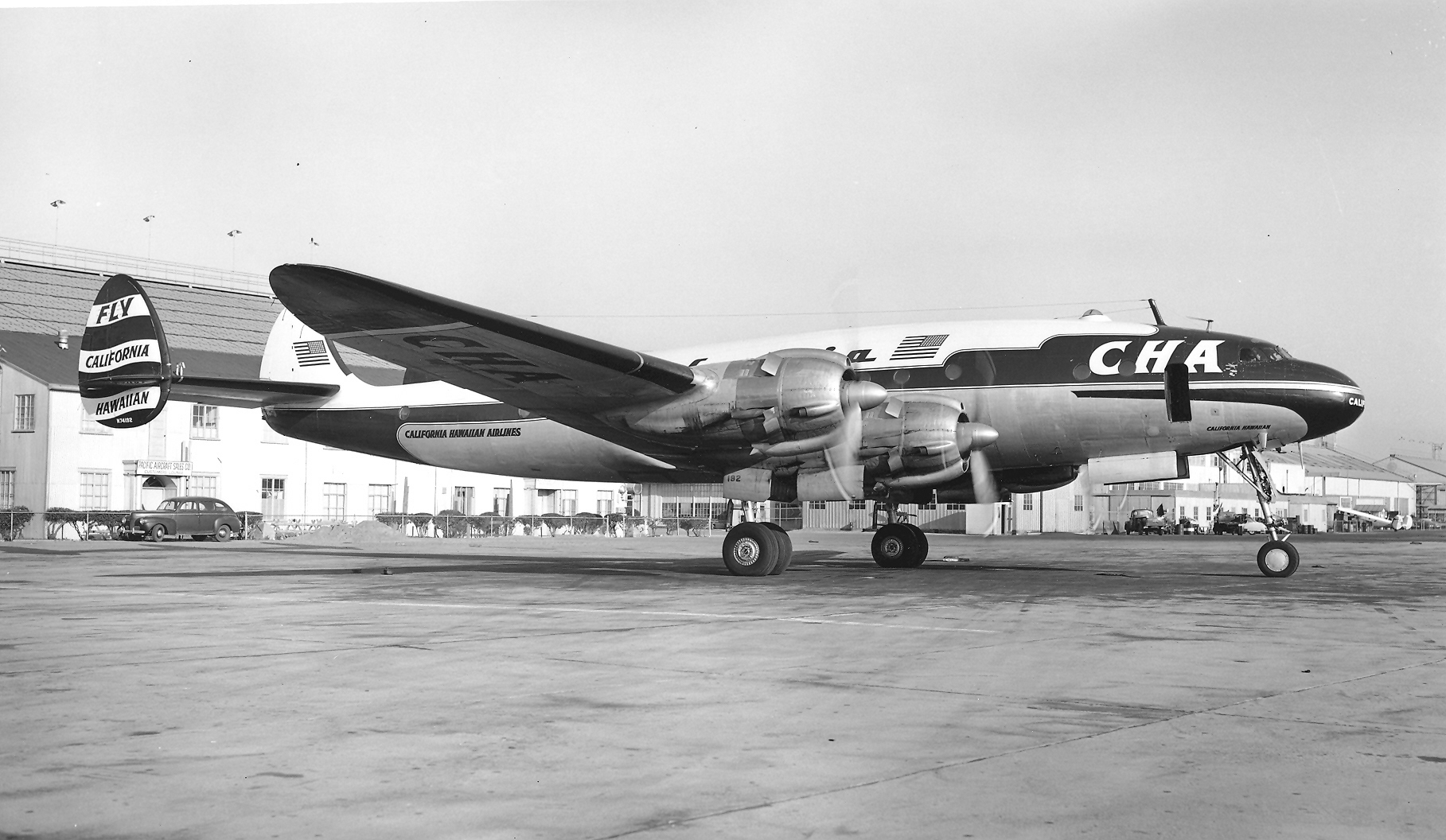
California Hawaiian Constellation leased from LAAS, Oakland February 1953. Kerkorian rebuilt the aircraft from salvage, making a substantial gain (see text)

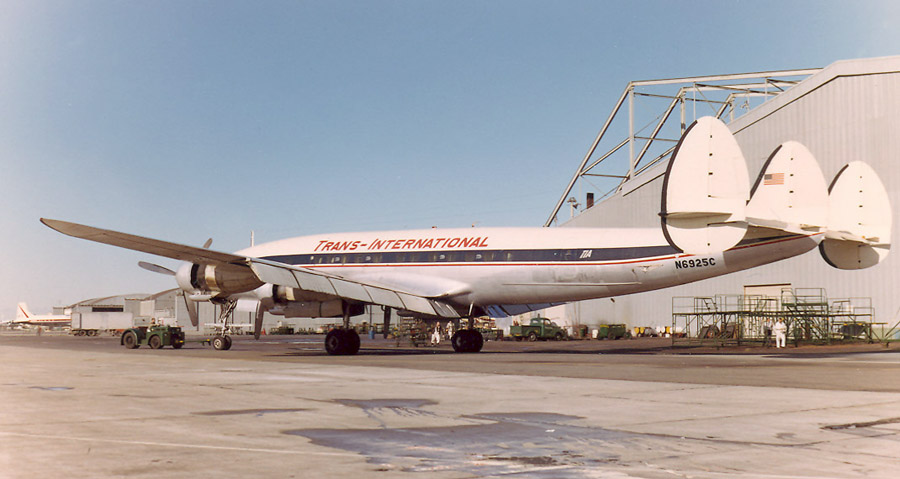
L-1049H Super Constellation

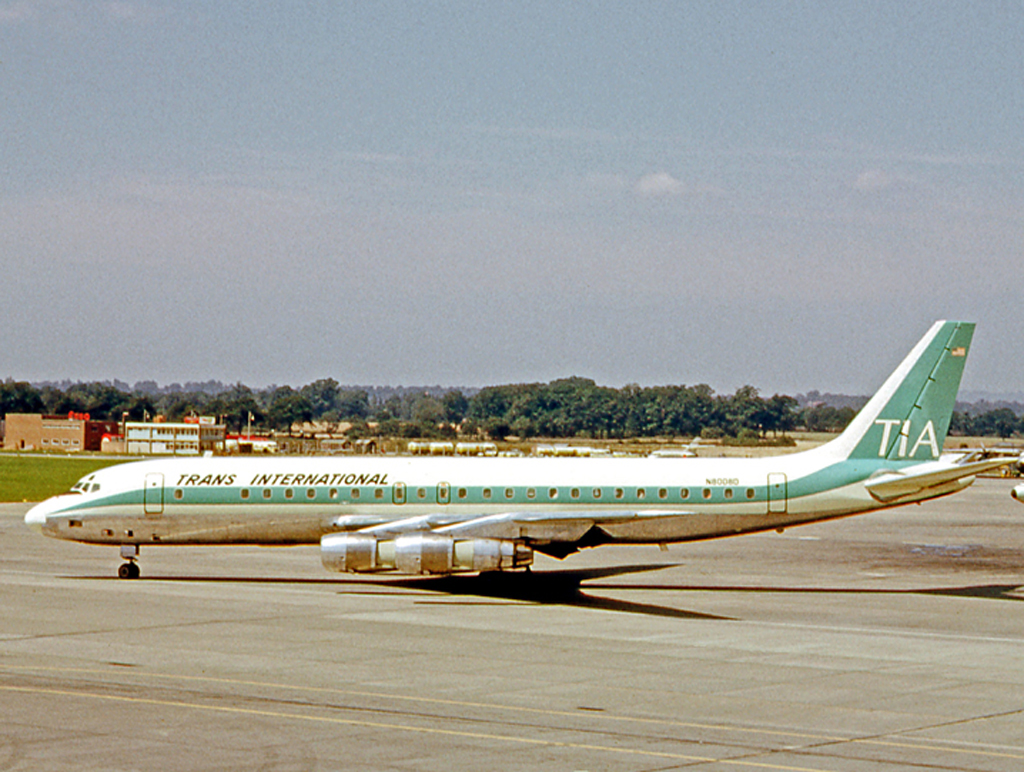
London Gatwick 1966. "Ship One", the DC-8 prototype that TIA bought in 1962

LAAS changed its name in 1960 in part to eliminate confusion with Los Angeles Airways, a scheduled helicopter airline. It originally wanted "California National Airlines", changing to "California International Airlines" when National Airlines objected, before settling on Trans International. Originally just a trade name, later in the year LAAS changed the name of the corporation. Coincident with the name change, the airline entered the scheduled market from the west coast to Hawaii flying DC-6B aircraft; its Hawaii representative was Peter Ueberroth, later famous for running the 1984 Los Angeles Olympics. TIA's 1960 revenues reflect a far higher level of scheduled service than previously (see Table 1). But from April 1960, the legal status of supplemental carriers was in question and when Congress settled the issue in 1962, it limited supplemental carriers to purely charter service from 1964.

=== Jets ===
In 1960 the US Air Force shifted emphasis from using its own transportation service to commercial charters, which it no longer awarded on the basis of competitive bidding. Instead, the CAB set uniform (and much higher) prices for military charters, which were awarded on the basis of participation in the Civil Reserve Air Fleet (CRAF), rewarding airlines that enrolled aircraft in CRAF that the military valued, such as long-range jets and those with cargo capability, and above all convertible (able to carry passenger or cargo) aircraft.

TIA was the first supplemental to fly jets, buying the Douglas DC-8 prototype, "Ship One", which had been upgraded with then-modern JT3D turbofan engines, in June 1962. TIA immediately landed a $6.2 million military charter contract, an amount greater than TIA's total 1961 revenue (see Table 2). In July 1963 TIA was the first airline of any kind to fly cargo jet charters for the military, leveraging the military's preference by acquiring a convertible passenger/cargo aircraft. Kerkorian later said moving to jets "was the real breakthrough." Note the substantial difference in performance between Table 1 and Table 2. Apart from "Ship One", TIA would buy 12 brand new DC-8s from Douglas in the 1960s, all convertible. Military charters boomed because of the Vietnam War. TIA had much lower costs than most airlines, and that plus higher military charter rates and demand for convertible jets resulted in fast growth and high operating margins. For instance, from 1964 to 1965, TIA's revenues grew by 56% while operating margin expanded from 19.4% to 33.0%.

In 1965, TIA's jets brought further benefit. The CAB provided an exemption for TIA (and World Airways) to offer European charters that summer. The CAB wanted more jet capacity and the supplemental airlines already certificated for Europe, Saturn and Capitol, had no jets and a single jet respectively. Obtaining Europe access was fortunate for TIA as it became the key non-military market for supplementals.

Table 2: Trans International Airlines financial results, 1961–1970(1) All supplemental air carriers
USD 000	1961	1962	1963	1964	1965	1966	1967	1968	1969	1970
Operating revenue:										
Military charter	3,960	9,973	10,559	11,591	13,731	18,543	14,034	22,124	22,630	25,832
Civilian charter	198	52	324	2,189	7,064	10,931	13,745	22,617	25,806	33,834
Scheduled	1,524	20								
Other	72	6	30	204	1,068	1,371	3,741	3,385	1,579	1,267
Total	5,754	10,050	10,910	13,984	21,863	30,846	31,519	48,125	50,016	60,933
Op profit (loss)	176	1,409	2,581	2,710	7,204	9,142	8,629	10,416	4,763	7,809
Net profit (loss)	276	1,280	1,856	1,101	3,890	4,545	5,391	6,535	4,012	2,388
Op margin (%)	3.1	14.0	23.7	19.4	33.0	29.6	27.4	21.6	9.5	12.8
Operating revenue:										
% of industry^{(1)}	7.0	9.4	11.8	13.2	15.5	14.7	12.2	14.8	13.8	18.1
Industry^{(1)} rank	5	3	4	4	3	3	3	2	3	1

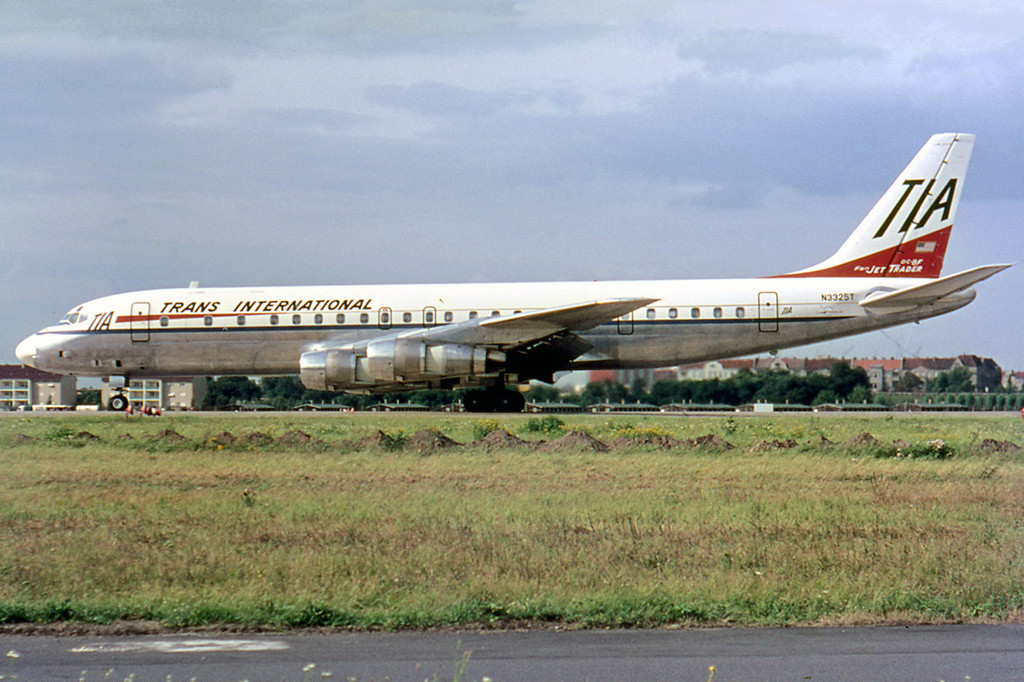
The cargo door of this convertible DC-8 is just visible

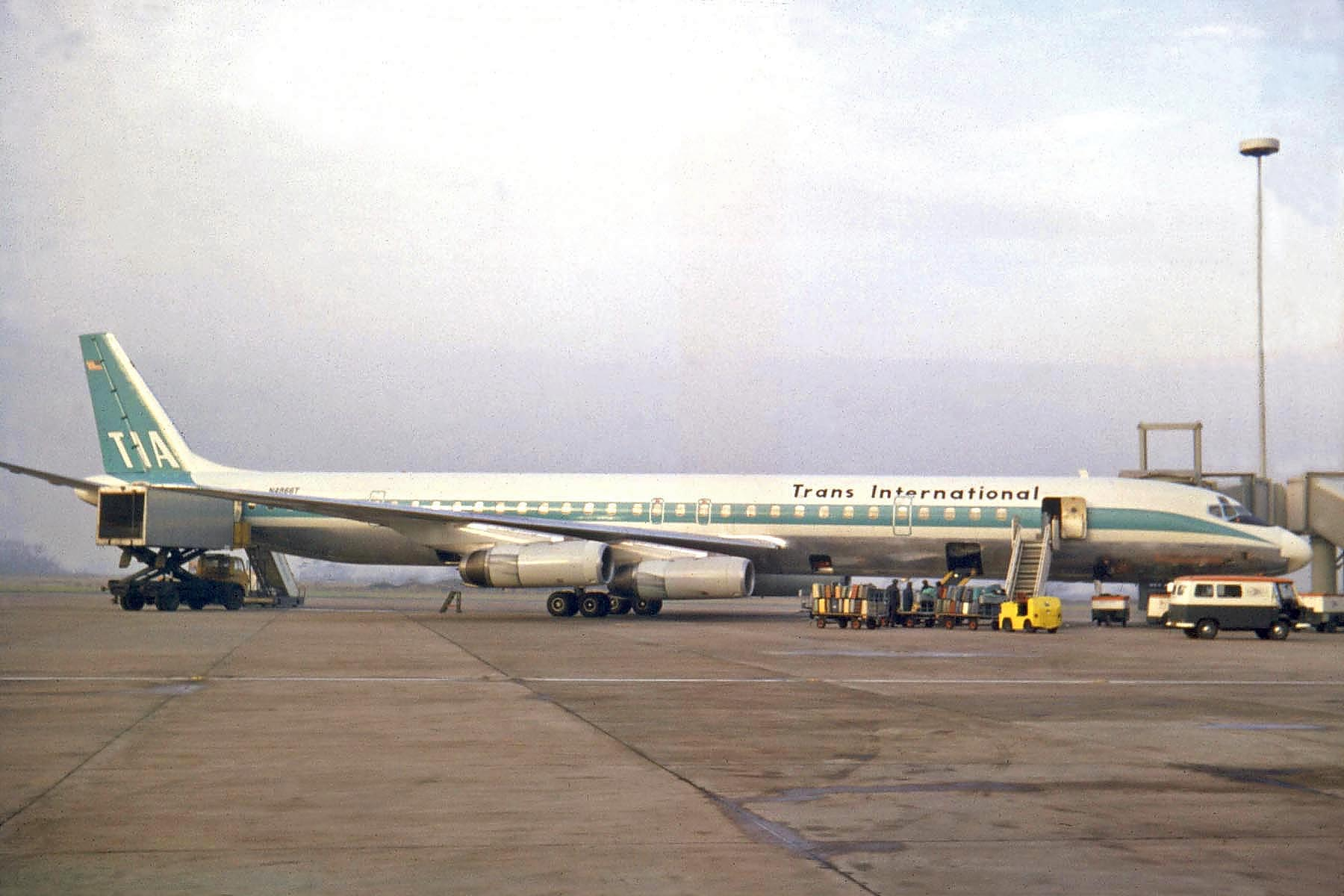
DC-8-63CF Manchester 1974

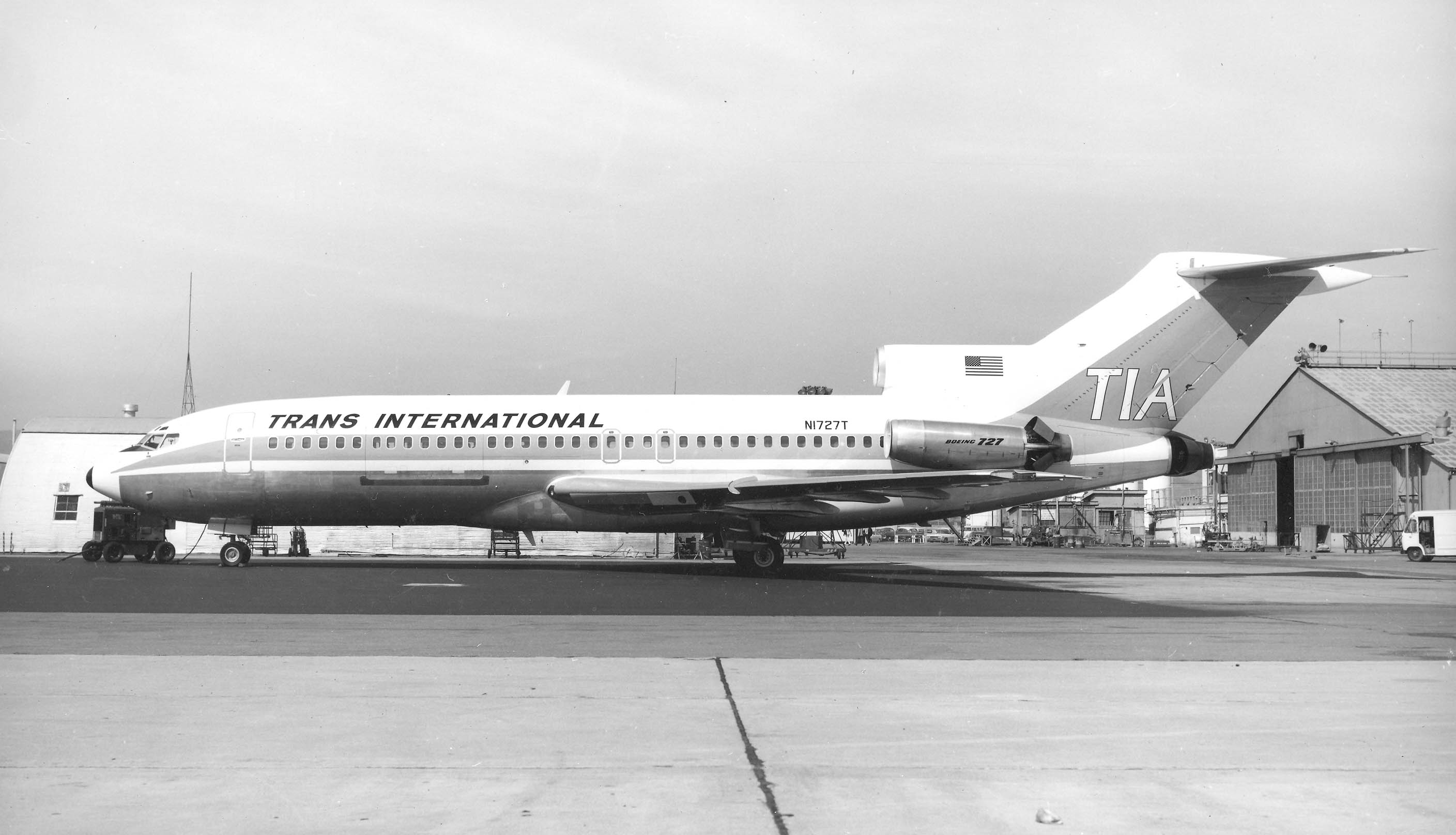
Two Boeing 727-100Cs were operated from 1968 through 1972

=== Studebaker & Transamerica ===
In October 1962, Studebaker, attempting to diversify, bought TIA for $2.7 million in stock. In 1964, Studebaker reversed course, and in June Kerkorian bought TIA back for $2.5 million in cash, with president Glenn Cramer a significant minority shareholder. To repay the loan the company took to pay Studebaker, Kerkorian took TIA public in April 1965, the first supplemental to go public. In 1966, the airline moved its headquarters from Las Vegas to Oakland, California. In September 1967, Transamerica Corporation, an insurance company then based in San Francisco, offered to buy TIA for stock then valued at $147 million (over $1.3 billion in 2025 terms). The transaction closed March 1968. Kerkorian made $104 million. Cramer became president and CEO of TIA and a director of Transamerica.

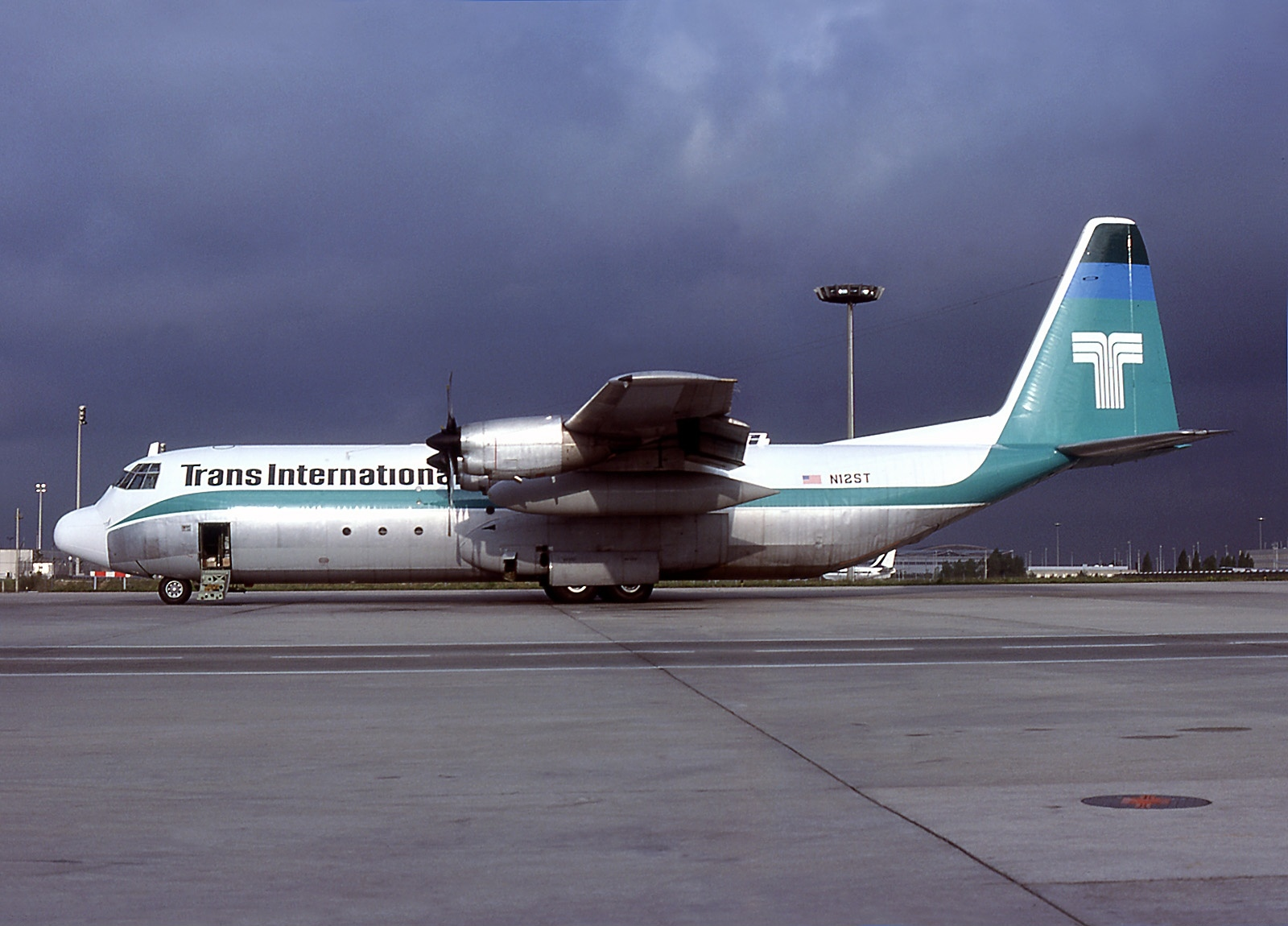
L-100-30 Hercules inherited from Saturn merger, Paris 1977

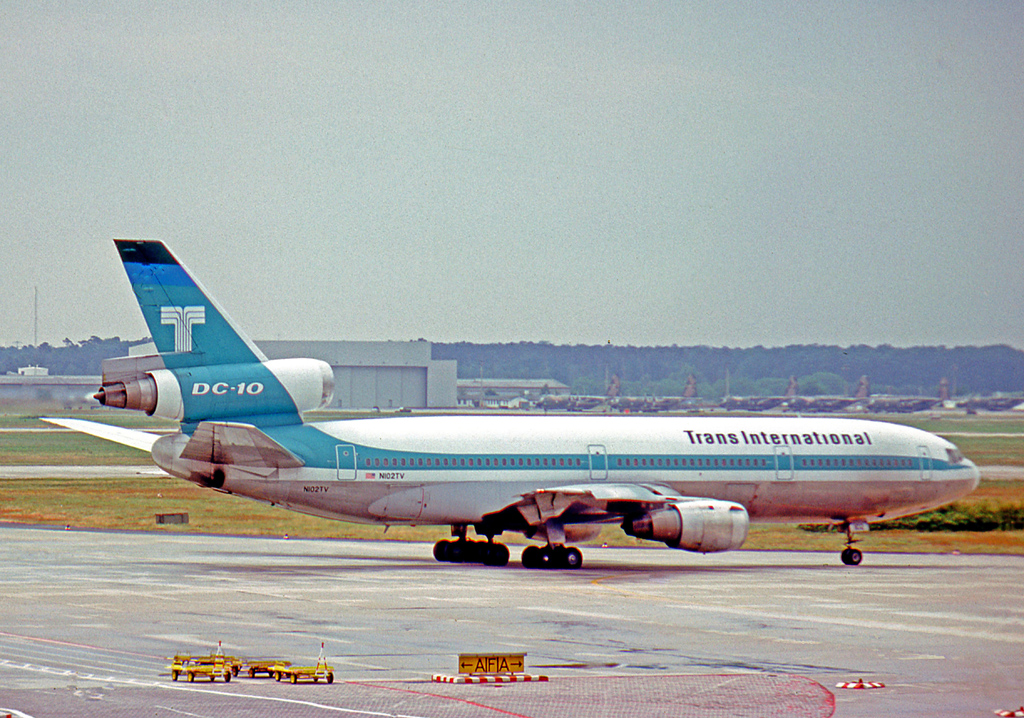
Douglas DC-10 in Frankfurt 1977

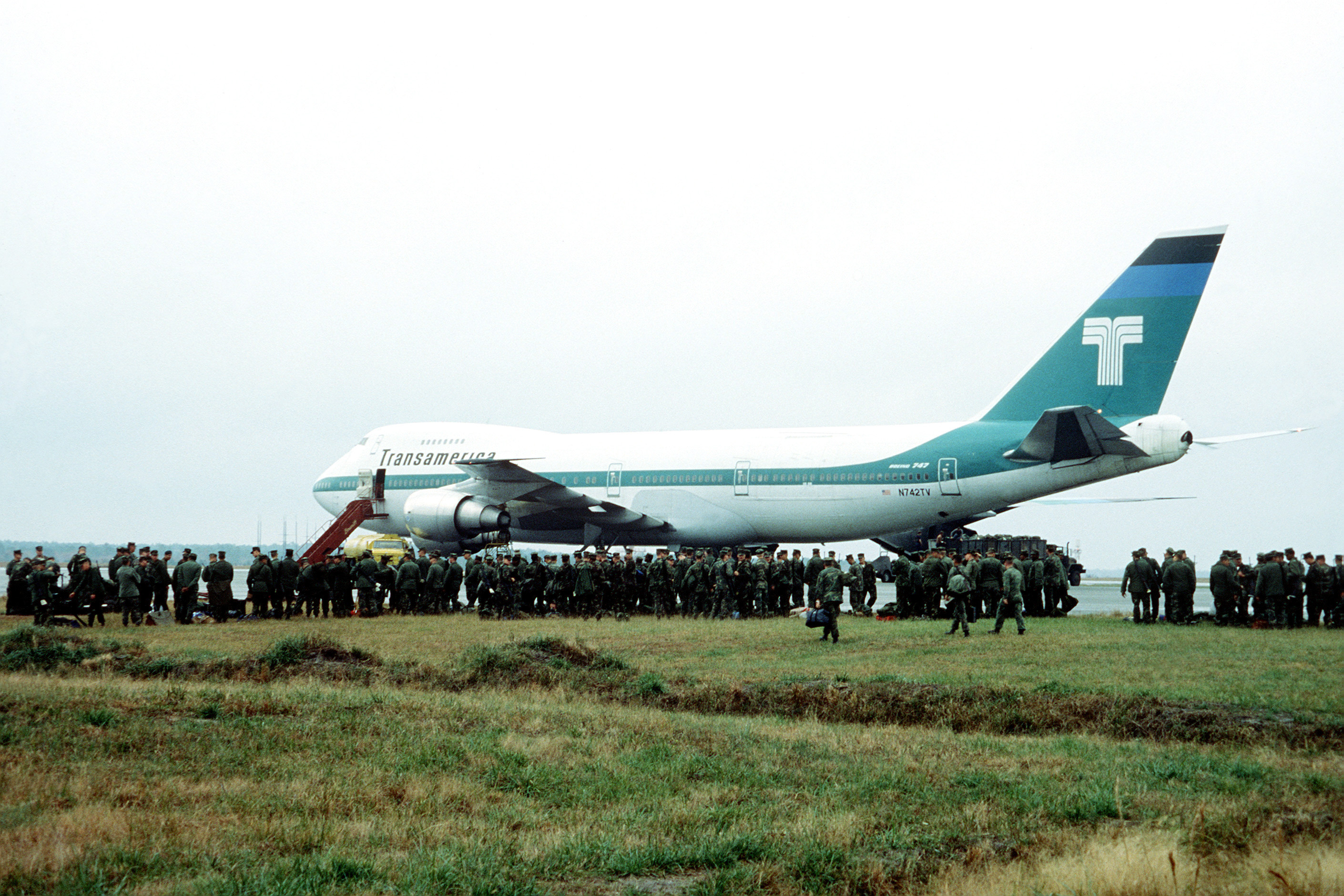
Boeing 747 at MCAS Cherry Point 1982

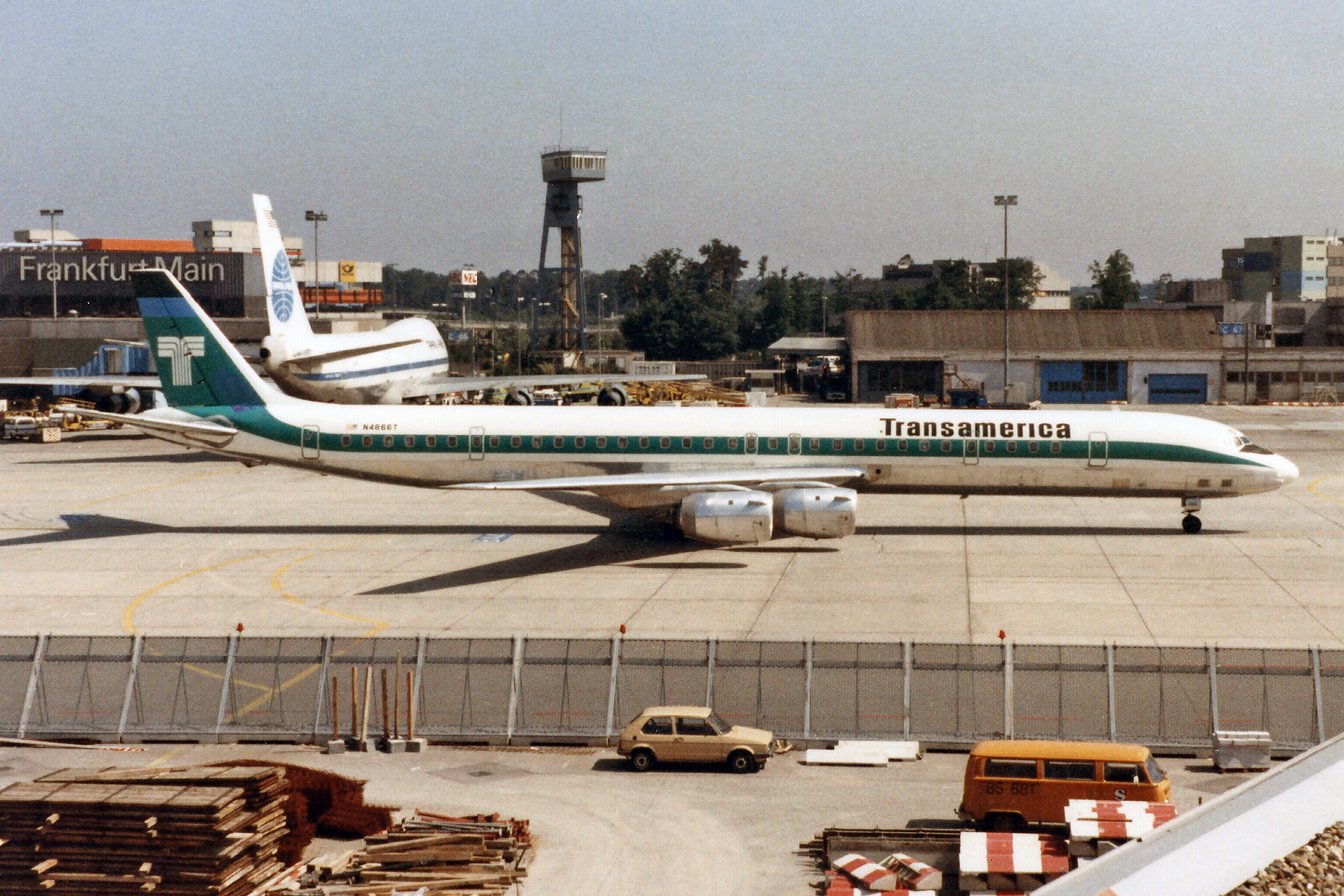
Same aircraft as the DC-8-63CF above, but re-engined with CFM56s to be a DC-8-73CF, Frankfurt 1985

=== Europe ===
Europe became a uniquely important commercial market for supplementals. By 1974, there were eight remaining supplemental carriers, the so-called Big Five (Capitol, Overseas National (ONA), Saturn, TIA and World) and Little Three (Johnson, McCulloch and Modern). By 1972, TIA had the leading market share in Europe charters, and such charters accounted for 64.6% of TIA's commercial passenger revenue, the lowest such metric of any of the Big Five. For instance, ONA depended on Europe for 99.5% of commercial passenger revenue. The Europe market grew strongly until 1973, when demand unexpectedly plateaued, a situation that became even more challenging in the fourth quarter when fuel prices spiked as a result of the 1973 oil crisis. TIA was already more diversified, relative to Europe commercial revenue, than others in the Big Five. In offering to buy Saturn Airways in 1974, TIA bought an airline that, by the time the deal closed in 1976, had no Europe passenger charter exposure at all.

For further on supplemental air carriers and US-Europe charters see:

=== Saturn Airways merger ===
In April 1974, TIA tentatively agreed to buy Saturn for $15 million in Transamerica stock. As the CAB noted, Saturn was the most profitable supplemental, and complementary to TIA. In 1974, freight was 2/3 of Saturn's revenues versus 3.3% of TIA's, and military was 47% of Saturn's revenues versus 12.5% of TIA. Saturn withdrew from flying passengers entirely in November 1974. The transaction closed in November 1976 and in the meantime Saturn's financial performance improved significantly. Saturn renegotiated and the price more than doubled to $35 million (over $190 million in 2025 terms) by closing. TIA thus gained a strong freight business, including Lockheed L-100 Hercules and Lockheed L-188 Electra all-cargo aircraft. In particular, Saturn had a leading position in the domestic air freight networks Logair and Quicktrans of the US Air Force and US Navy, respectively. Saturn's share of the combined Logair/Quicktrans contract was as high as 86% during the mid-1970s, based on its monopoly as an L-100 provider, a position TIA inherited.

Table 3: Trans International Airlines financial results, 1971–1978(1) All supplemental air carriers
USD 000	1971	1972	1973	1974	1975	1976	1977	1978
Operating revenue:								
Military charter	21,362		11,649	13,116	26,100	24,807	72,855	71,970
Civilian charter	41,309	53,492	62,075	88,623	93,969	105,073	117,250	153,306
Other	3,119		(236)	2,892	3,277	3,910	20,711	5,884
Total	65,790	74,275	73,486	104,634	123,347	133,788	210,815	231,161
Op profit (loss)	12,066	4,304	2,934	3,754	17,601	12,394	16,397	25,651
Net profit (loss)	4,350		4,960	(1,490)	4,986	3,127	9,541	16,319
Op margin (%)	18.3	5.8	4.0	3.6	14.3	9.3	7.8	11.1
Operating revenue:								
% of industry^{(1)}	18.2	22.4	19.6	24.4	28.5	32.0	40.8	43.6
Industry^{(1)} rank	2	1	2	1	1	1	1	1

=== Deregulation and a new name ===
After the Saturn merger, TIA was by far the most dominant supplemental. As Table 3 shows, in 1978, the last year of the regulated era, TIA accounted for over 43% of all supplemental revenue. But TIA was still of modest size overall; in 1978, the largest scheduled airline by revenue was United Airlines, with over 15 times TIA's revenue at $3.5 billion. US airline deregulation came into effect in 1979, but by year-end 1978, the CAB had already approved TIA scheduled service to Europe. By May 1979, TIA was flying to Amsterdam from Los Angeles and New York. On October 1, the airline aligned its name with that of its parent, becoming Transamerica Airlines.

At the time, the airline said it wanted to become a leading international scheduled carrier and add eight Boeing 747s over three years. But instead, proud of its record of profitability, took a cautious stance, largely sticking to the charter business it knew, aiming, as of 1982, to generate 15% of revenues from scheduled service, with military charters another 30%. It continued to focus on international charters, where it benefitted from former players dropping out, as, overall, international charter volumes declined substantially in the first few years after deregulation. TA's scheduled service reflected this modest ambition, with low frequency service on relatively few routes, mostly international (see Destinations). In the end Transamerica took delivery of just three 747s. It converted 12 DC-8-61/63s to DC-8-71/73s (re-engining with CFM56-2 high-bypass turbofans and other upgrades). Transamerica noted its 70-series DC-8s had the same number of seats as the then brand-new Boeing 767, while having international range (not true of initial 767 models, which, pre-ETOPS, were not intercontinental aircraft) and operating costs within 1% of the 767, at half the cost.

Table 4: Transamerica Airlines financial results, 1979–1986
USD 000	1979	1980	1981	1982	1983	1984	1985	1986
Operating revenue:								
Passenger charter	160,967	205,963	168,895	137,032	117,225		115,093	84,848
Cargo charter	92,285	113,885	126,721	79,454	105,983		133,455	54,468
Scheduled	8,329	23,470	20,516	20,002	20,756		7,306	
Other	8,958	4,650	2,931	3,020	3,626		9,467	4,552
Total	270,539	347,969	319,063	239,507	247,590	274,000	265,321	143,868
Op profit (loss)	11,057	34,272	24,010	26,290	33,112		15,448	(19,990)
Net profit (loss)	16,495	24,457	24,733	23,559	26,650	38,100	20,796	2,197
Op margin (%)	4.1	9.8	7.5	11.0	13.4		5.8	-13.9
Scheduled as % of total revenue	3.1	6.7	6.4	8.4	8.4		2.8	

=== Labor issues, a second Trans International and end ===
In late 1983 TA asked for wage givebacks from its pilots. The pilot union, Air Line Pilots Association (ALPA), claimed this amounted to a 50% wage cut (later bumping this to 60%) for a profitable airline. But TA noted new entrant charter carriers had much lower wages. Pilot wages were an industry-wide issue. For instance, in 1983, bankrupt Continental Airlines imposed much lower wages on pilots and others. In the same year, ALPA said it had provided savings of over $2 billion to airlines since deregulation through concessions.

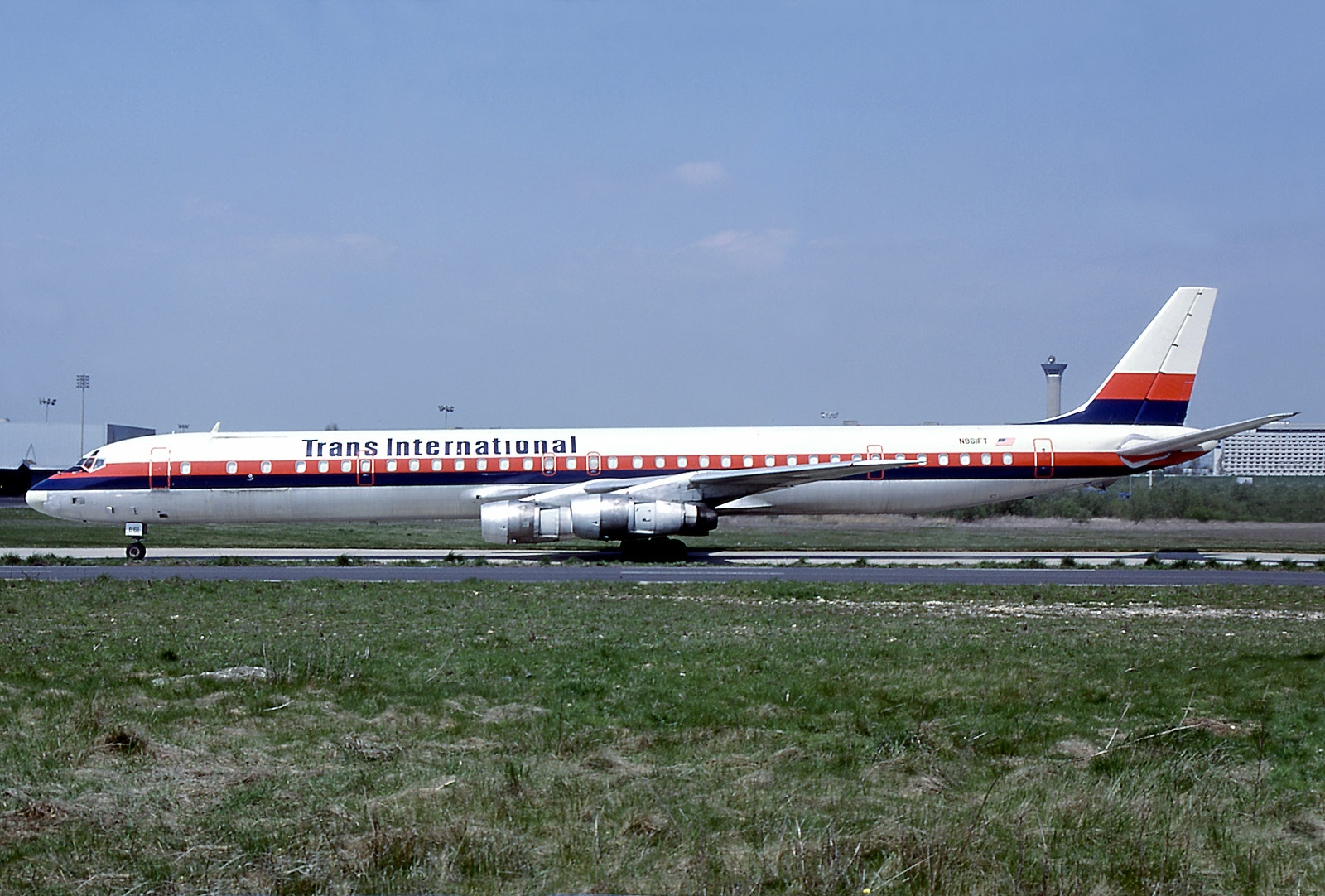
Second TIA DC-8-61CF Paris 1985

In 1984, Transamerica Corporation announced it would establish a second Trans International Airlines as a non-union sibling to TA, using the certificate of a dormant airline, Louisville-based Central American International. It denied any intention to transfer business to the new carrier from TA, but ALPA was skeptical. ALPA offered concessions in exchange for killing the new airline, but Transamerica declined. ALPA sued to force the government to impose labor protective provisions, a routine part of airline mergers in the regulated era. The government argued this was inconsistent with the intent of airline deregulation and courts agreed, confirming the ability of a holding company to own both union and non-union airlines.

In 1984, TA got a court injunction to stop a pilot sickout. In early 1985, the pilots launched a public relations campaign against the airline. In August, TA shut its Oakland maintenance base, contracting with World Airways, also based at Oakland. Many former TA mechanics transferred to World, but at lower rates. A few days later, TA also fired 75 white-collar workers. Layoffs reflected, in part, the sale of five DC-8s. The reduction in activity can be seen in Table 4. In January 1986, Transamerica Corporation announced it was exiting non-financial businesses, putting TA for sale along with Budget Rent-a-Car and an industrial subsidiary. In July, an employee group formed to buy TA was shocked at the (undisclosed) asking price, and meanwhile TA's entire fleet was on the market. Finally, in August, the corporation decided to shut the airline as of September 30, timing driven by annual military contract awards. In the subsequent year, TA would sell two 747s for $126 million and 7 DC-8-73CFs for $165.5 million, a third 747 for $63 million and 11 Hercules for $86.35 million. TA received insurance proceeds for a 12th Hercules when the $7.75 million aircraft, leased to Southern Air Transport, crashed on 4 October 1986, only days after TA shutdown.

== Destinations ==
November 1947: LAAS was offering scheduled service between Los Angeles and Big Bear, California.

1 October 1960: TIA schedule shows 3/week service from Burbank and San Francisco to Honolulu.

1 May 1984: Transamerica system timetable shows mostly low frequency (couple times/week) flights:

- Dallas/Ft Worth
- Frankfurt
- Honolulu
- Los Angeles
- New York
- St Louis
- Shannon
- Tel Aviv

== Fleet ==
Los Angeles Air Service, April 1956:

- 2 Curtiss C-46
- 2 Douglas DC-4

Los Angeles Air Service, January 1960:

- 1 Douglas DC-6B

Trans International, August 1962:

- 1 Douglas DC-8-51
- 2 Lockheed L-1049E Super Constellation
- 1 Lockheed L-1049G Super Constellation
- 3 Lockheed L-1049H Super Constellation

Trans International, August 1971:

- 2 Boeing 727-171C
- 3 Douglas DC-8-61CF
- 7 Douglas DC-8-63CF

Trans International according to World Airline Fleets 1979 (copyright 1979):

- 1 Douglas DC-8-61CF
- 9 Douglas DC-8-63CF
- 3 McDonnell Douglas DC-10-30CF
- 11 Lockheed L-100-30 Hercules
- 9 Lockheed L-188C Electra

Transamerica Airlines, September 1986:

- 3 Boeing 747
- 7 Douglas DC-8-73CF
- 13 Lockheed L-100-30 Hercules
- 1 Lockheed L-188C Electra

== Accidents and incidents ==
- 8 September 1970: Trans International Airlines Flight 863, DC-8-63CF N4863T, a ferry flight from New York to Washington, DC, crashed shortly after takeoff when a foreign object lodged in the right elevator, jamming it and forcing the aircraft into an extreme nose-high attitude, from where it stalled and crashed. The National Transportation Safety Board cited the failure of the captain to adequately monitor the aircraft and reject the takeoff in time. All 11 crewmembers, the only people on board, died.
- 24 May 1977: Two employees were killed and a wing torn off Trans International Airlines Lockheed L-100-30 Hercules N24ST in a fuel tank explosion during routine maintenance at Oakland. The aircraft was repaired and returned to service, but destroyed in 1984.
- 18 November 1979: Transamerica Lockheed L-188C Electra N859U operating Logair flight 3N18 for the US Air Force departed Hill Air Force Base en route to Nellis Air Force Base in Las Vegas. While climbing between 12,000 and 13,000 ft, all electrical power was lost; the crew requested an immediate descent. The aircraft attained high airspeed and high rate of descent and disintegrated in flight, killing all three crew members. Probable cause was progressive failure of the electrical system leading to disabling or erratic performance of critical instruments and lighting in night-time instrument conditions. The crew became disoriented and lost control. The aircraft was inherited from Universal Airlines via Saturn Airways. Two other Universal Electras (N851U, N855U) previously crashed near Hill Air Force Base.
- 23 August 1980: Transamerica L-100-30 N18ST was descending into North Island Naval Air Station from Pensacola Naval Air Station at 5,000 ft when its tail hit and killed a parachutist near Otay, California. Aircraft and crew landed safely with minimal damage.
- 27 August 1983: Transamerica L-100-30 N17ST crashed in fog at 2,650 ft near Dundo, Angola, killing all seven crew on board.
- 29 December 1984: Transamerica L-100-30 N24ST was destroyed on the ground by gunfire at Cafunfo, Angola. Transamerica was operating under contract to diamond-mining company Diamang and UNITA took responsibility for the attack, in which the first officer was killed.

== See also ==
- Trans International Airlines (1985–1989)
- Saturn Airways
- Transamerica Corporation
- Studebaker
- Logair
- Quicktrans
- Supplemental air carrier
- List of defunct airlines of the United States
