= Baldwin Lake (San Bernardino County, California) =

Lake in the state of California, United States

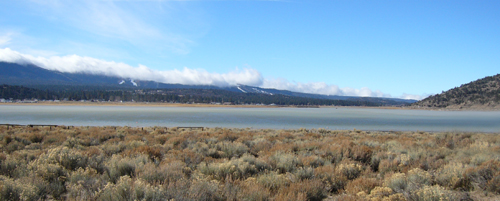
- Baldwin Lake seen from northernmost shore, looking southwest toward Big Bear City.

- Location within California Location within the United States
- Location: San Bernardino County, California
- Coordinates: 34°16′26″N 116°48′31″W
- Type: intermittent, alkali lake
- Primary outflows: Santa Ana River
- Max. width: 1 mile (1.6 km)
- Max. depth: 25 feet (7.6 m)
- Surface elevation: 6,752 feet (2,058 m)
- Settlements: San Bernardino

Baldwin Lake is a natural, intermittent, alkali lake in the Big Bear Valley of the San Bernardino Mountains, in San Bernardino County, California. It is located east of Big Bear Lake reservoir and Big Bear City.

== Geography ==
The lake is at a surface elevation of 6,752 feet (2,058 m). Its deepest point it can be approximately 25 feet (7.6 m). At its widest, the lake is more than 1 mile (1.6 km) across. It is in the headwaters watershed of the Santa Ana River. The terrain surrounding the lakebed supports montane chaparral and pinyon–juniper woodland habitats.

=== Baldwin Lake Ecological Reserve ===
Baldwin Lake is within the 156-acre Baldwin Lake Ecological Reserve. It is at the intersection of California State Route 18 and Holcomb Valley Road on the north side of the lake. Hwy 18 wraps around the northeastern and northern shores of Baldwin Lake.

The Baldwin Lake linanthus (Linanthus killipii) is a rare plant at lake's pebble plain and adjacent meadows, that is endemic to the locale and an endangered species.

== History ==
The Eye of God, a historic quartz dome, is located in the Baldwin Lake area.

Benjamin Davis Wilson encountered the lake in 1845, while tracking horse thieves in the San Bernardino Mountains. When Wilson saw that the region was populated by many grizzly bears, he divided his 22 men into hunting partners. The men slaughtered 11 bears for the fur pelts. While returning to Jurupa (Riverside), they slaughtered another 11 bears for the fur. Wilson named the region Big Bear Valley, and the lake he called Lake Big Bear.

In 1884, the Bear Valley Land and Water Company began construction of a dam southwest of the lake. The company's stakeholders named the new reservoir Big Bear Lake. They also renamed the alkali lake to Baldwin Lake, after Elias Jackson "Lucky" Baldwin, who came to Big Bear and Holcomb Valley in 1876 when he purchased Gold Mountain Mine, later renamed Baldwin Mine.

== Baldwin Lake Community Improvement Association ==
In January 2011, the Baldwin Lake Community Improvement Association was formed which is a non-profit volunteer organization of residents, business and property owners in the lake's adjacent community, who share a common appreciation for the beauty and diversity of Baldwin Lake. The Baldwin Lake CIA is within the Big Bear City CDP for demographic statistics.

The mission is to improve, beautify and preserve the quality of life in Baldwin Lake through the development of outdoor environmental education programs, community gardens, and a small business incubator to create a sustainable future for the residents of Baldwin Lake.

== See also ==
- Baldwin Lake (Los Angeles County, California) — pond at Los Angeles County Arboretum and Botanic Garden, Baldwin's former estate.
- List of lakes of California
- San Bernardino Mountains-related topics
