= Big Bear Valley =

Valley in California

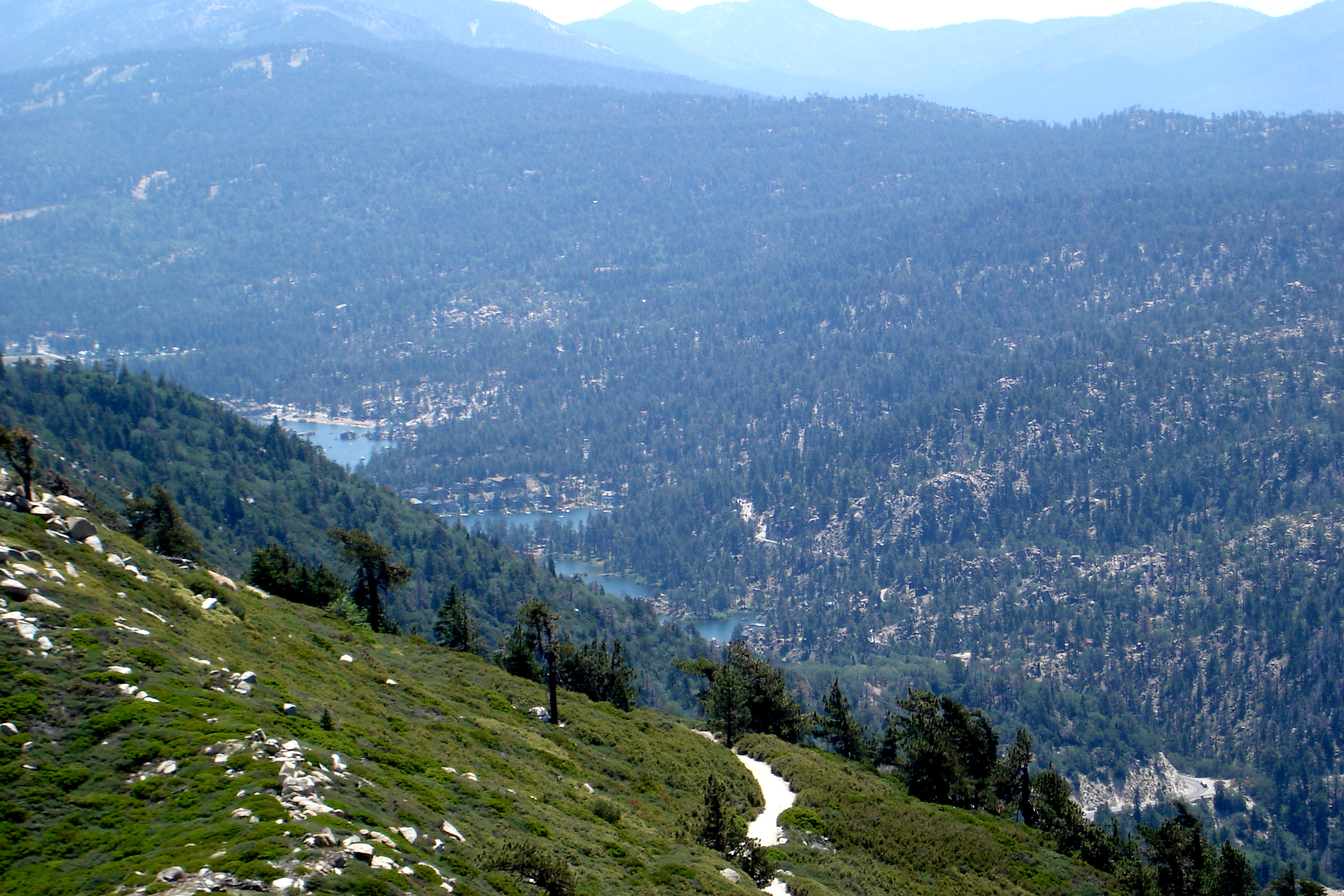

- Location within California

Geography
- Coordinates: 34°16′35″N 116°49′29″W
- Interactive map of Big Bear Valley

Big Bear Valley is a valley in San Bernardino County, California, United States. The valley, in the San Bernardino Mountains, includes Big Bear Lake, Big Bear City, Fawnskin, Holcomb Valley, Sugarloaf, Erwin Lake, Baldwin Lake, Bluff Lake and Lake Williams.

== History ==
Spanish colonists arrived in the valley in the eighteenth century and encountered indigenous people who they referred to as "Serranos" living there. The Serranos had established a few permanent settlements in the mountains, and also lived in the area during the summer months of the year. They may have moved into the area some 3,000 years prior.

== Natural history and conservation ==
This biologically diverse area is also where bald eagles can be seen via webcam.
