= The Eye of God (Big Bear) =

Quartz dome in California, U.S.

The Eye of God (Serrano: Hatauva) is a quartz dome which is a landmark in the Baldwin Lake area near Big Bear City, California. It is a megalith which is a sacred tribal landmark for the native Yuhaaviatam "People of the Pines," a clan of Serrano people who have lived in the region for at least 2,000 years.

The Serranos worshipped the dome, which they referred to as the eye of their creator Kruktat (Kokitach). It is where the Serrano's creation narrative takes place. The Serrano Native Americans still hold the place sacred and believe God's spirit remains here. Legend says God was watching to make sure the natives treated one another well. Originally a full dome, it was dynamited during 1940s as it was believed it to be full of gold.

Their creation stories involves a God, Kruktat, who created the People. After falling ill, Kruktat journeyed to the mountains where he lay dying in a bear cave. Tended by the First People, he was taken to Maktsuk, today called Pan Hot Springs, where he was bathed by human caretakers. Knowing he was dying, Kruktat instructed the People to cremate him and protect his body from Coyote, who eats dead things. Kruktat died near present-day Baldwin Lake. During the cremation the eye of Kruktut flew out and became the giant snow quartz megalith known as Aapahunane’t, or God's Eye. Coyote snuck through the bowed legs of bear and snatched Kruktat's heart in his mouth. The people hit Coyote, and as he ran into the mountains above Baldwin Lake, the dripping blood turned the rocky soil red. When the creator died the people mourned and their tears turned into pine trees, the area called Yuhaaviat. The nuts from the trees became food for the Yuhaaviatam, or People of the Pines.
