= Sugarloaf, California =

Unincorporated community in California, United States

- Unincorporated community
- Location within the state of California Sugarloaf, California (the United States)
- Coordinates: 34°14′36″N 116°49′44″W
- Country: United States
- State: California
- County: San Bernardino
- Elevation: 7,096 ft (2,163 m)

Population (2000)
  - Total: 1,816
- Time zone: UTC-8 (Pacific (PST))
  - Summer (DST): UTC-7 (PDT)
- Area code: 909

Sugarloaf is an unincorporated community residential area less than a mile south of Big Bear City and 8 miles from the eastern tip of Big Bear Lake in the San Bernardino Mountains of San Bernardino County, California. The area is primarily residential with a convenience store and a post office located at the center of the community. The residential area is set at an elevation of 7,096 feet (2,163 m) at its center, whereas its extreme northern border is 6,998 feet above sea level and the southern tip sits at 7,218 feet (2,200 m) above sea level. There is no municipal organization for the area, and all fire, water, and police service is provided by San Bernardino County. The ZIP code for the community is 92386, the area code 909, and the population is 1,816. Big Bear High School is located in the northern part of the community.

The name of the town is taken from the nearby mountain, Sugarloaf. The mountain is so called because it appeared to some to bear a resemblance to a sugarloaf. (In settlement days sugar was sold in pieces of a loaf.)

== Geography ==
The community is officially recognized by the US Geological Survey with a USGS feature ID of 273936. Latitude and longitude for the location are listed as 34°14′36″N 116°49′44″W. These coordinates are contained within the County of San Bernardino. The elevation above mean sea level is 7,093 feet. This community is served by the Bear Valley Unified School District.

== Demographics ==
As of the census of 2000, there were 1,816 people, 2,659 housing units, and 520 single-family owner-occupied homes in the ZIP Code. The population density was 860.1 inhabitants per square mile (332.1/km^{2}). There were 8,705 housing units at an average density of 1,376.8 per square mile (531.6/km^{2}). The racial makeup of the ZIP Code was 61.9% White, 1.2% African American, 2.3% Native American, 1.0% Asian, 0.1% Pacific Islander, 3.6% from other races, and 6.3% from two or more races. Hispanic or Latino of any race were 27.9% of the population.

There were 520 households, out of which 31.2% had children under the age of 18 living with them, 44.5% were married couples living together, 14.8% had a female householder with no husband present, and 34.3% were non-families. 27.2% of all households were made up of individuals, and 8.7% had someone living alone who was 65 years of age or older. The average household size was 2.47 and the average family size was 3.01.

In the ZIP Code the population was spread out, with 28.3% under the age of 18, 4.5% from 18 to 24, 26.1% from 25 to 44, 26.6% from 45 to 64, and 11.6% who were 65 years of age or older. The median age was 39 years. For every 100 females, there were 100.4 males. For every 100 females age 18 and over, there were 89.4 males.

The median income for a household in the ZIP Code was $34,219, and the median income for a family was $41,343. Males had a median income of $31,128 versus $16,214 for females. The per capita income for the ZIP Code was $14,663. About 20.1% of families and 32.3% of the population were below the poverty line, including 33.3% of those under age 18 and 0.0% of those age 65 or over.

=== Vacation population ===
The population who own vacation homes in Surgarloaf overwhelmingly outnumber the full-time residents. Only 2/9 of the households in Sugarloaf have permanent occupancy by a family or a householder. This is due to the relatively low cost housing, as well as it being close to a ski resort, and a popular destination for Southern California vacationers in both the summer and winter. Because of this, demographics and population are likely different when all homeowners are taken into consideration.
