= Big Bear City, California =

Census-designated place in California, United States

- Unincorporated community Census-designated place
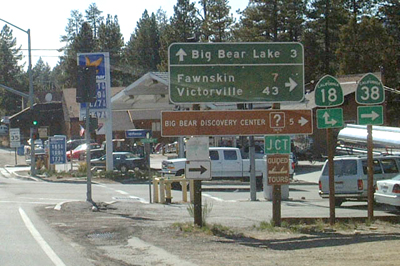
- Looking west at corner of Big Bear Boulevard and Greenway in Big Bear City. This is where Highways 18 and 38 cross over.
- Interactive map of Big Bear City, California
- Location in the United States
- Coordinates: 34°14′20″N 116°46′42″W
- Country: United States
- State: California
- County: San Bernardino

Area
  - Total: 32.03 sq mi (82.96 km^{2})
  - Land: 32.02 sq mi (82.92 km^{2})
  - Water: 0.015 sq mi (0.04 km^{2}) 0.05%
- Elevation: 6,772 ft (2,064 m)

Population (2020)
  - Total: 12,738
  - Density: 397.9/sq mi (153.62/km^{2})
- Time zone: UTC−8 (Pacific)
  - Summer (DST): UTC−7 (PDT)
- ZIP Codes: 92314, 92386
- Area code: 909
- FIPS code: 06-06406
- GNIS feature IDs: 2407838

Big Bear City is an unincorporated community and census-designated place in San Bernardino County, California, United States along the east shore of Big Bear Lake and surrounded by the San Bernardino National Forest. It is 27 miles (43 km) northeast of the city of San Bernardino, and immediately east of the incorporated city of Big Bear Lake. Its population was 12,738 at the 2020 census, up from 12,304 at the 2010 census. Big Bear City is mostly residential, with smaller houses and cabins laid out in typical square block fashion. Big Bear is on the Pacific Crest Trail.

Standard Air Lines of Los Angeles began a regular airline service to the community in the summer of 1929. Its post office was founded as Van Duesen in 1927 but changed its name to Big Bear City six months later. The Big Bear City Post Office opened in 1928 and still operates.

Despite the name, Big Bear City is not an incorporated city, and should not be confused with the adjacent incorporated city of Big Bear Lake.

== Etymology ==
Big Bear got its name due to the large number of grizzly bears that once roamed the area. Although grizzly bears were exterminated in the valley at the turn of the 20th century, there are still thousands of black bears found in Big Bear Valley.

== History ==
=== Pre-colonial period ===
The first humans to inhabit Big Bear Valley were the Serrano Indians, who trace their beginnings to Bear Valley. Serrano means mountaineers, or those of the Sierras. The Serrano people that settled much of the San Bernardino Mountains, called themselves Yuhaviatam, or: people of the pines.

It is estimated that the Serrano natives first settled in Big Bear between 1,500 and 2,000 years ago. The Serranos had both winter and summer settlements throughout the area. While their winter village was located in Lucerne Valley, they relocated to villages in the San Bernardino mountains during summer, as the altitude provided cooler temperatures. Villages were often located by rivers and lakes, however, mountain hunting camps were also established on higher elevations. Besides hunting, they also consumed pinyon nuts, mesquite beans, screw-beans, juniper berries and seeds. One of four major Serrano ethnographic sites was located in Big Bear City, called: Kayah-pia-t. Big Bear, and Lucerne Valley clans, both belonged to the same tribe: the Coyote Pervetum.

Settling here because of the region's many natural resources, they harvested acorns and herbs, but also hunted deer, rabbits, and other wildlife. A number of mortar holes can be seen in Big Bear City; these holes made by the Serranos, were utilized to ground acorns into meals. The oldest known remains of a human settlement in Big Bear Valley can be seen at the Indian Grinding Rocks in Big Bear City, called: The Eye of God, which is a sacred site to the Serrano people. The Serrano's creation narrative took place at The Eye of God, which was known as Hatauva.

The earliest known contact with European settlers in Big Bear occurred when Spanish Father Francisco Garcés arrived during his 1774-1776 expedition. Another source states, that the first contact happened in 1845 during a punitive expedition against the Native-Americans.

== Geography ==
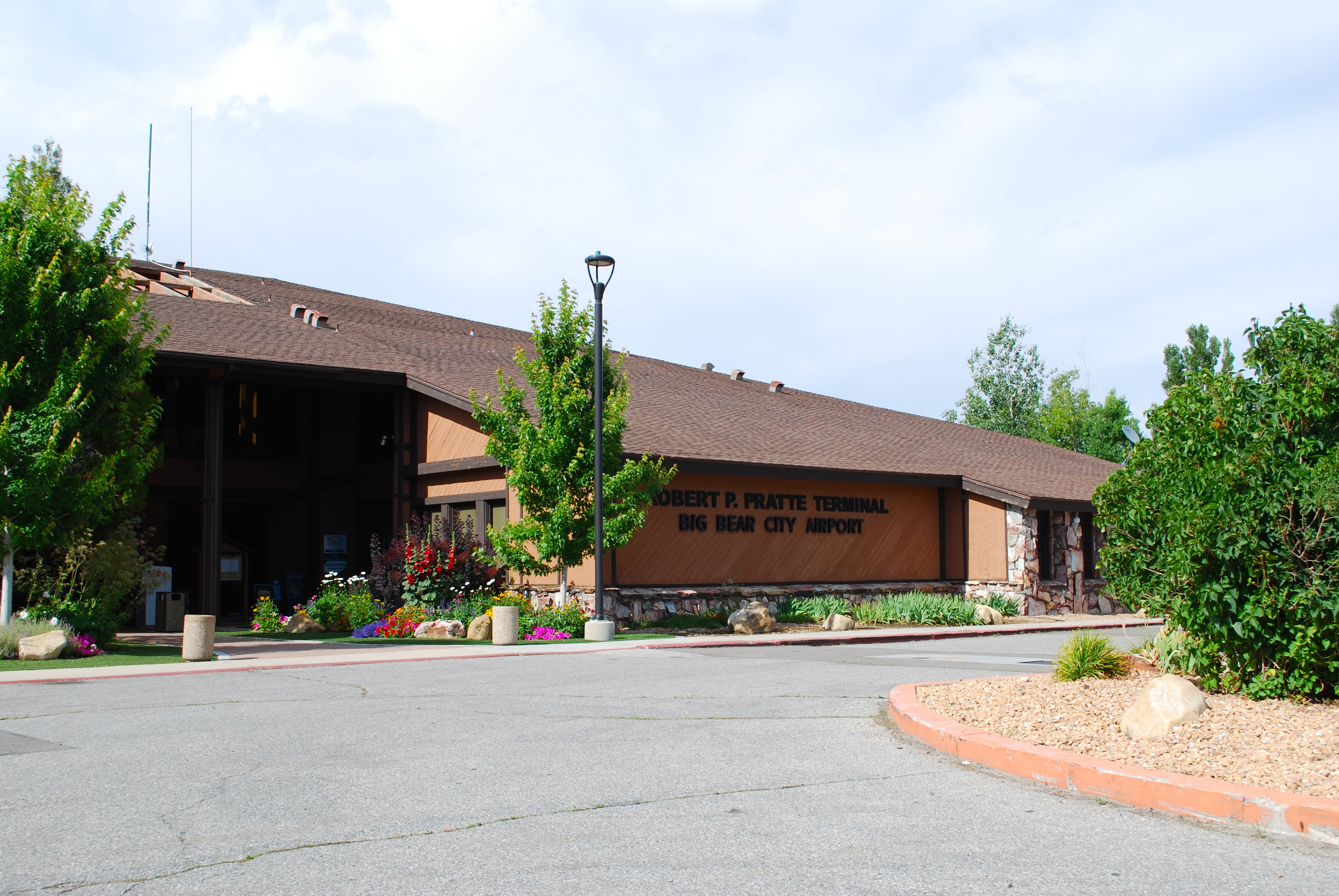
Big Bear City Airport.

For statistical purposes, the United States Census Bureau has defined Big Bear City as a census-designated place (CDP). According to the United States Census Bureau, the CDP has a total area of 32.0 square miles (83 km^{2}), 99.95% of it land, and 0.05% of it water.

The nearby ski resorts consist of Snow Summit and Bear Mountain.

Most of the town and the business district are centered on Big Bear Boulevard. Its limits are defined on the west by Division Road and on the east by the left turn at Highway 38, which goes to Redlands and Highway 18 which goes south to San Bernardino and north to Lucerne Valley. Though its south boundary is loosely defined by the residential boundary, the north side is defined by North Shore Road. The east–west postal divider of Big Bear City is Green Way Drive. It is here that Highway 18 (Big Bear Boulevard) turns north and crosses over to North Shore Drive heading east toward Lucerne Valley, and Highway 38 coming from the east turns north to North Shore and heads west to Big Bear Dam in the city of Big Bear Lake, California.

Sugarloaf is a large residential area that lies to the south of Big Bear City.

== Demographics ==
Historical population
Census	Pop.	Note	%±
1950	1,434		—
1960	1,562		8.9%
1970	5,268		237.3%
1980	11,151		111.7%
1990	4,920		−55.9%
2000	5,779		17.5%
2010	12,304		112.9%
2020	12,738		3.5%
U.S. Decennial Census; 1850–1870 1880-1890; 1900 1910 1920; 1930 1940 1950; 1960 1970 1980; 1990 2000 2010

Big Bear Lake was first listed as an unincorporated place in the 1950 U.S. census; and then as a census designated place in the 1980 U.S. census. A portion of the CDP was incorporated as the city of Big Bear Lake prior to the 1990 U.S. census.

=== Racial and ethnic composition ===
Big Bear City CDP, California – Racial and ethnic composition Note: the US Census treats Hispanic/Latino as an ethnic category. This table excludes Latinos from the racial categories and assigns them to a separate category. Hispanics/Latinos may be of any race.
Race / Ethnicity (NH = Non-Hispanic)	Pop 2000	Pop 2010	Pop 2020	% 2000	% 2010	% 2020
White alone (NH)	4,714	9,322	8,750	81.57%	75.76%	68.69%
Black or African American alone (NH)	31	72	93	0.54%	0.59%	0.73%
Native American or Alaska Native alone (NH)	61	125	81	1.06%	1.02%	0.64%
Asian alone (NH)	26	98	140	0.45%	0.80%	1.10%
Native Hawaiian or Pacific Islander alone (NH)	4	17	28	0.07%	0.14%	0.22%
Other race alone (NH)	5	18	87	0.09%	0.15%	0.68%
Mixed race or Multiracial (NH)	191	329	680	3.31%	2.67%	5.34%
Hispanic or Latino (any race)	747	2,323	2,879	12.93%	18.88%	22.60%
Total	5,779	12,304	12,738	100.00%	100.00%	100.00%

=== 2020 census ===
As of the 2020 census, Big Bear City had a population of 12,738. The population density was 397.9 inhabitants per square mile (153.6/km^{2}).

The census reported that 99.8% of the population lived in households, 0.2% lived in non-institutionalized group quarters, and no one was institutionalized. 89.4% of residents lived in urban areas, while 10.6% lived in rural areas.

There were 5,523 households, out of which 22.3% included children under the age of 18. Of all households, 43.5% were married-couple households, 7.6% were cohabiting couple households, 23.0% had a male householder with no partner present, and 25.9% had a female householder with no partner present. About 31.3% of households were one person, and 14.4% were one person aged 65 or older. The average household size was 2.3. There were 3,363 families (60.9% of all households).

The age distribution was 18.8% under the age of 18, 6.5% aged 18 to 24, 22.7% aged 25 to 44, 29.3% aged 45 to 64, and 22.7% who were 65 years of age or older. The median age was 47.1 years. For every 100 females, there were 101.9 males, and for every 100 females age 18 and over there were 100.0 males age 18 and over.

There were 12,086 housing units at an average density of 377.5 units per square mile (145.8 units/km^{2}). Of these, 5,523 (45.7%) were occupied and 6,563 (54.3%) were vacant. Of occupied units, 71.8% were owner-occupied and 28.2% were occupied by renters. The homeowner vacancy rate was 3.6% and the rental vacancy rate was 11.5%.

Racial composition as of the 2020 census
Race	Number	Percent
White	9,418	73.9%
Black or African American	112	0.9%
American Indian and Alaska Native	191	1.5%
Asian	141	1.1%
Native Hawaiian and Other Pacific Islander	35	0.3%
Some other race	1,202	9.4%
Two or more races	1,639	12.9%

=== 2023 estimates ===
In 2023, the US Census Bureau estimated that 4.9% of the population were foreign-born. Of all people aged 5 or older, 85.0% spoke only English at home, 10.4% spoke Spanish, 2.6% spoke other Indo-European languages, 0.8% spoke Asian or Pacific Islander languages, and 1.2% spoke other languages. Of those aged 25 or older, 91.8% were high school graduates and 28.4% had a bachelor's degree.

The median household income was $72,457, and the per capita income was $38,030. About 11.0% of families and 15.3% of the population were below the poverty line.

== Government ==
In the California State Legislature, Big Bear City is in the 19th senatorial district, represented by Republican Rosilicie Ochoa Bogh, and in the 34th Assembly district, represented by Republican Tom Lackey.

In the United States House of Representatives, Big Bear City is in California's 23rd congressional district, represented by Republican Jay Obernolte.

== Transportation ==
Big Bear City Airport is a general aviation airport in Big Bear City. There are no commercial air services to this airport, although at least two airlines, including Trans World Airlines, have served Big Bear in the past. This airport may also be used for medical evacuations, and as a base for forest-fighting aircraft when there are fires close by. The airport is very popular with local general aviation pilots. The closest major airport is Ontario International Airport.

== Education ==
It is in the Bear Valley Unified School District.

== Wildlife ==
Mammals such as squirrels, chipmunks, raccoons, coyotes and skunks are commonly sighted, while black bears, mountain lions, bobcats, gray foxes and mule deer are more rarely observed.

Potentially dangerous animals include mountain lions, black bears and coyotes. A mountain lion responsible for eating a dog was killed by the sheriff in Big Bear City in 2010.

Although grizzly bears were previously common, they became extinct from Big Bear Valley in 1906.

== See also ==
- The Eye of God
- Gold Mountain Manor
- Big Bear Valley Historical Museum
